= Ukrainian cuisine =

Culinary traditions of Ukraine

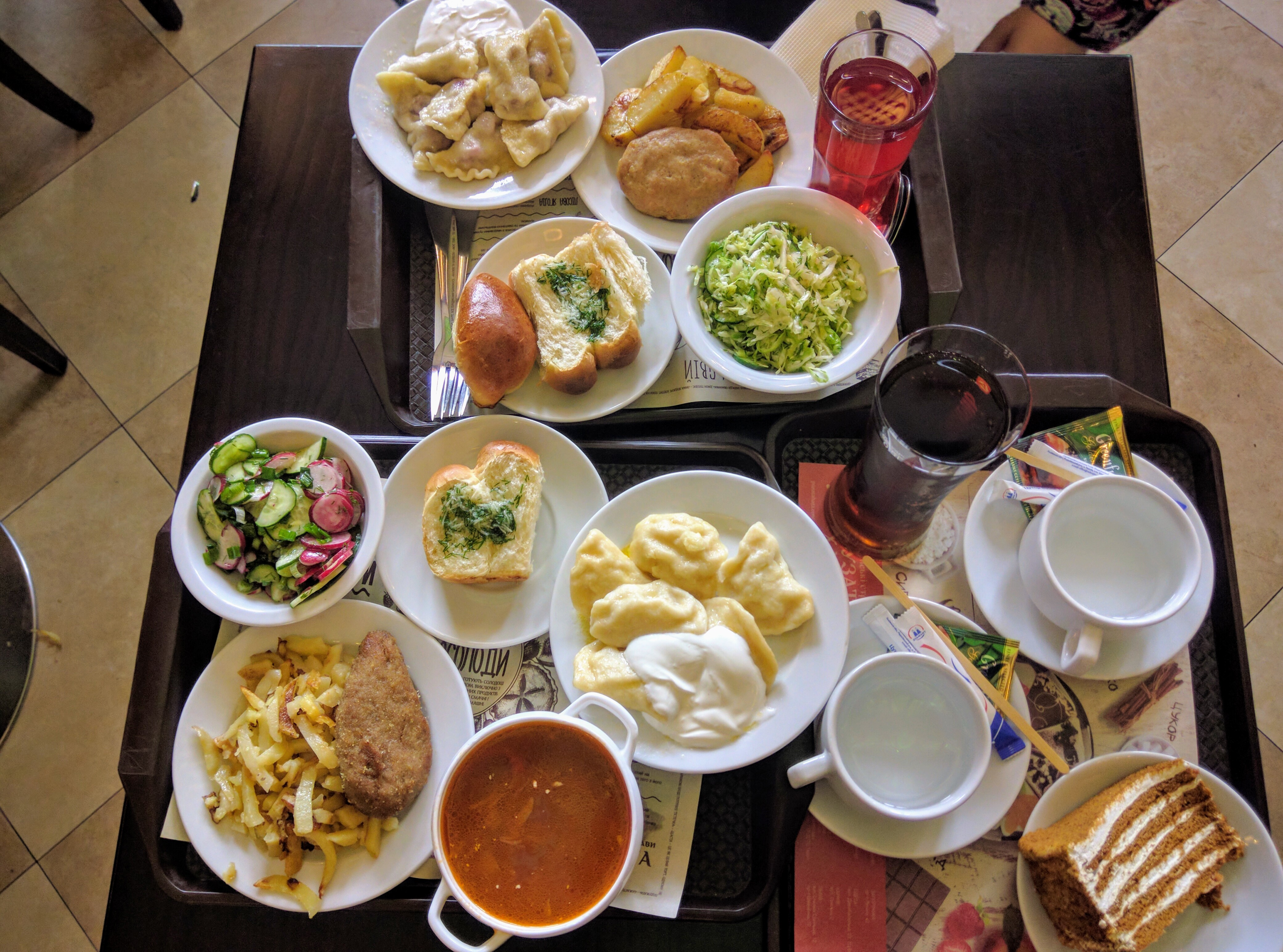
Typical Ukrainian food from a modern restaurant in Lviv

Ukrainian cuisine is the collection of the various cooking traditions of the people of Ukraine, one of the largest and most populous European countries. It is heavily influenced by the rich dark soil (chornozem) from which its ingredients come, and often involves many components. Traditional Ukrainian dishes often experience a complex heating process – "at first they are fried or boiled, and then stewed or baked. This is the most distinctive feature of Ukrainian cuisine".

The national dish of Ukraine is red borscht, a well-known beet soup, of which many varieties exist. However, varenyky (boiled dumplings similar to pierogi) and a type of cabbage roll known as holubtsi are also national favourites, and are a common meal in traditional Ukrainian restaurants. These dishes indicate the regional similarities within Eastern European cuisine.

The cuisine emphasizes the importance of wheat in particular, and grain in general, as the country is often referred to as the "breadbasket of Europe". The majority of Ukrainian dishes descend from ancient peasant dishes based on plentiful grain resources such as rye, as well as staple vegetables such as potato, cabbages, mushrooms and beetroots. Ukrainian dishes incorporate both traditional Slavic techniques as well as other European techniques, a byproduct of years of foreign jurisdiction and influence. As there has been a significant Ukrainian diaspora over several centuries (for example, over a million Canadians have Ukrainian heritage), the cuisine is represented in European countries and those further afield, particularly Argentina, Brazil, and the United States.

During the period of Soviet rule Ukrainian cuisine experienced significant standardization, and the lack of consumer products led to the loss of many authentic recipes or their replacement with simplified variants. The Soviet period also saw the introduction of numerous dishes from other cuisines into the ration of Ukrainians. Following Ukraine's independence, the development of market economy led to the emergence of new trends in the country's cooking practices, such as the spread of industrially-produced convenience foods and development of the restaurant scene. Modern Ukrainian cuisine is characterized by the adoption of new techniques and ingredients, but at the same time preserves many authentic elements.

== History ==
=== Medieval cuisine of modern-day Ukrainian lands ===
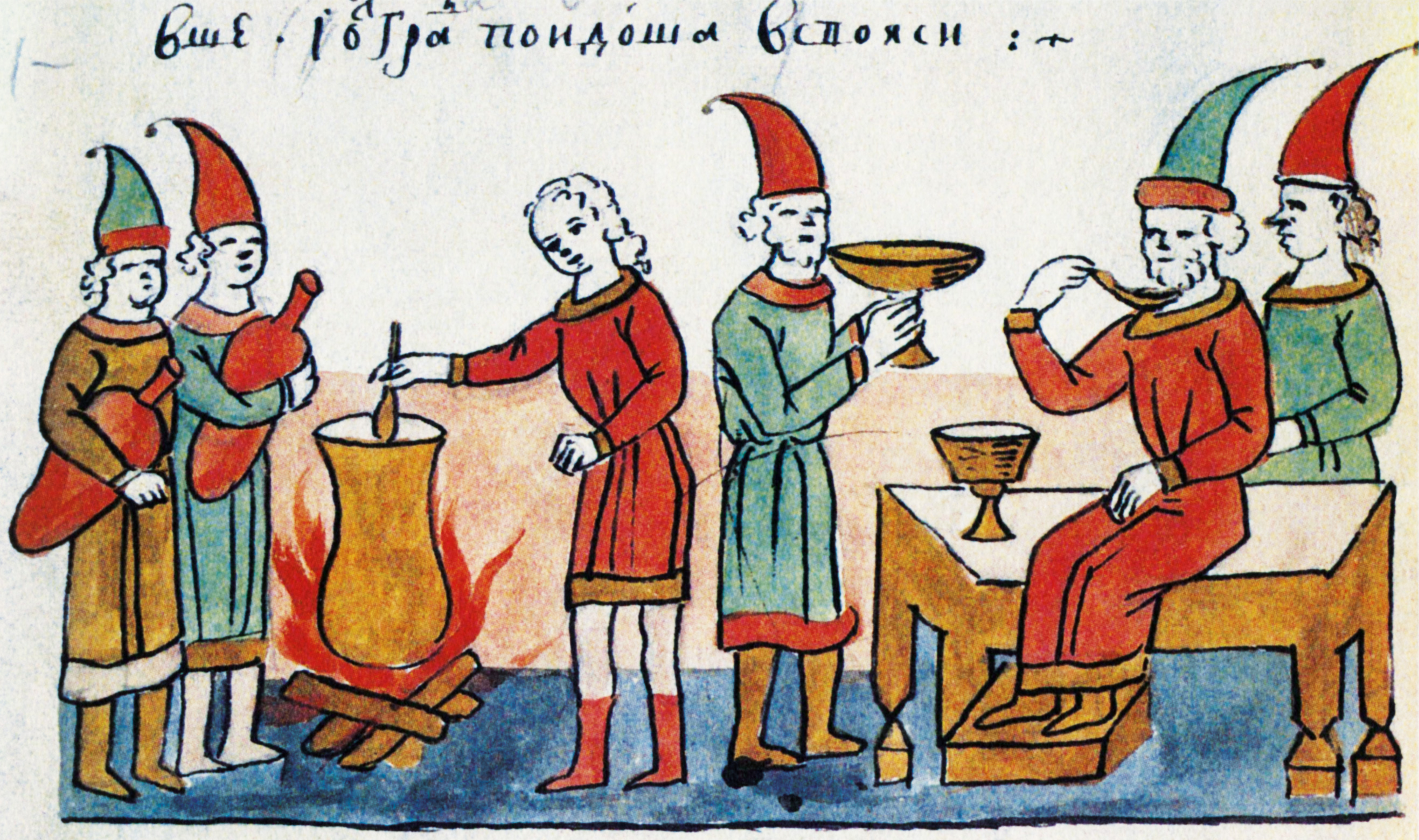
Brewing of kissel in Belgorod (modern-day Bilohorodka), depicted in a miniature from the Radziwiłł Chronicle

Slavic tribes, which settled the territory of modern Ukraine during the early Middle Ages, cultivated cereals such as rye, wheat and barley. The main food of the inhabitants of Kyivan Rus' was bread, most commonly made from rye. The Ukrainian word for rye (жито) itself derives from the Slavic verb "to live", which demonstrates the importance of that culture for the historical population of Ukraine. Wheat bread during that era was predominantly consumed by the upper classes. Both leavened and unleavened bread was known in Rus', with the former produced with the addition of hops. Cereal dishes such as kasha, usually made from millet, were common among all groups of the population, and also played a ritual role (koliva). Buckwheat, as well as flax, hemp, melons, watermelons, beets, poppies, oats and peas were also cultivated in Rus' territories.

Another important part of the popular diet during the Rus' period consisted of vegetables, especially cabbage and turnips. A significant portion of harvested vegetables would be salted or pickled to extend their storage period. Other vegetables widespread in Rus' territories were carrots, dill, garlic and lentils. In the 13th century onions were introduced in the territory of modern Ukraine. Wild plants such as sorrel, goosefoot and berries such as raspberry, blackthorn, guelder-rose, brambles, and grapes, as well as mushrooms, were also widely consumed by the population. Grapes were also cultivated for the production of raisins and as a condiment, but they were only available to the upper classes. Nuts were valued for their oil.

To provide themselves with meat products, medieval Eastern Slavs engaged in animal husbandry and hunting. The latter activity was popular among both the noble elite and common people. Rus' people consumed the meat of various mammals and birds such as deer, elk, auroch, roe deer, bison, boar, hare, partridge, grouse, goose, pigeon, swan and crane. Swan meat was considered a delicacy and is mentioned in bylinas stemming from that time. Meat was usually boiled or roasted on an open fire, but with time, frying and braising in fat also became widespread. Different varieties of fish, including pike, carp, sander and common bream constituted another crucial element of the diet in Rus' times. To prolong their shelf life, fish products would normally be salted, smoked or dried. Caviar, especially from sturgeon, was also popular.

Milk products consumed in medieval Rus' included cheese and butter. Milk was also used in some pagan rituals. Colostrum was a popular treat among the population, despite a ban on its consumption introduced by the church. A popular speciality widespread in modern-day Ukraine during the Medieval era was kissel, which was first mentioned in the Laurentian codex under the year 997 as a drink consumed by inhabitants of Belgorod near Kyiv. Among other drinks present in Rus' chronicles are kvass and honey. Desserts such as sweetened bread, prianyky and berries with honey were also known in Ukrainian lands from Rus' times.

=== Early modern Ukrainian cuisine ===
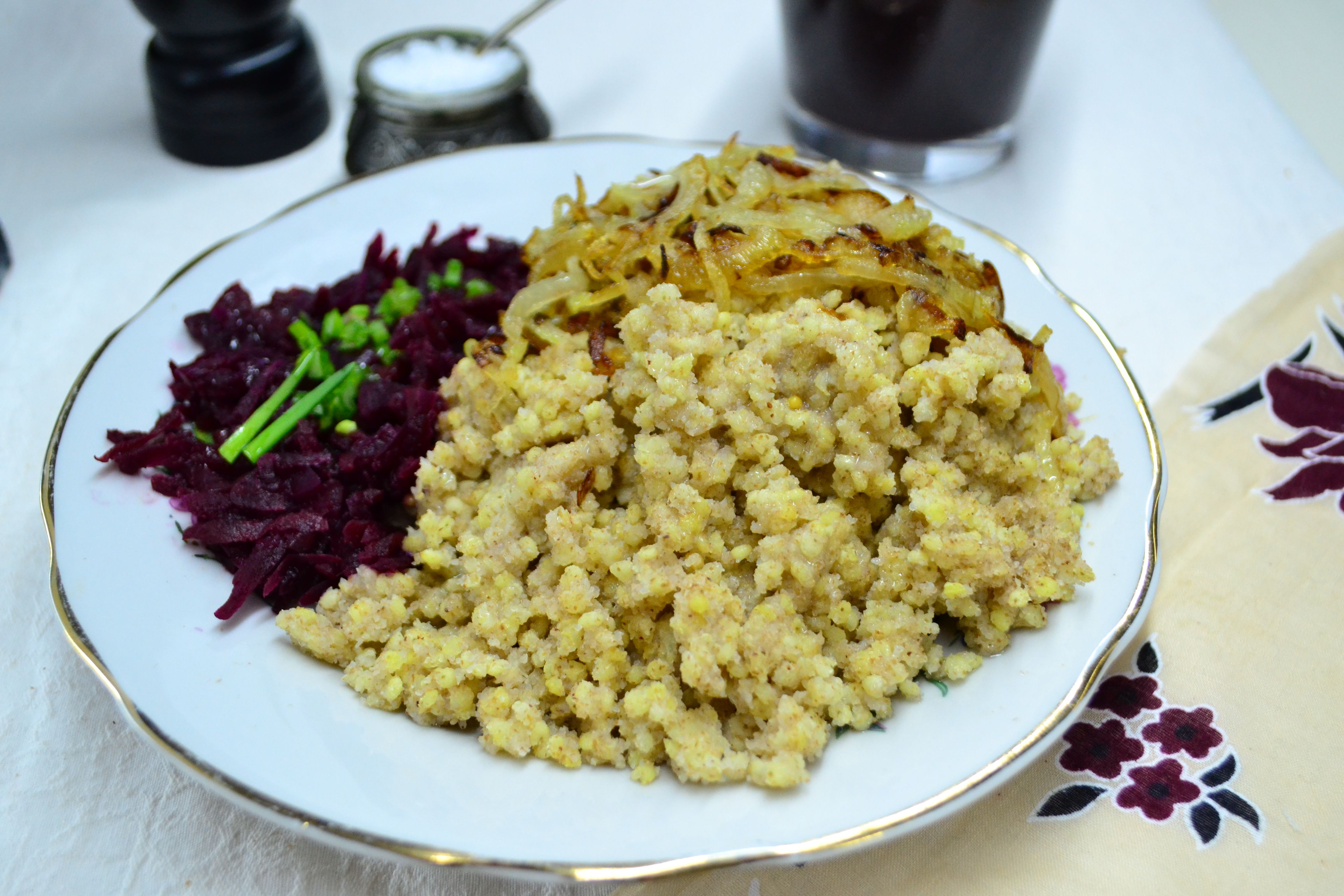
Teteria – a traditional dish common among Ukrainian Cossacks

According to Ukrainian historian Oleksii Sokyrko, during the era of Polish–Lithuanian rule in the late medieval and early modern times the Ukrainian culinary tradition was developing as part of the general food culture of the Polish–Lithuanian Commonwealth. In that period cereals and bread continued to form the base of the diet for most people in Ukraine, but legumes including peas and beans were also widely consumed, particularly in western regions such as Galicia. One of the first documented mentions of borshch, the symbol of modern Ukrainian cuisine, also comes from the times of Polish rule: travelling through Kyiv in 1584, Danzig merchant Martin Gruneweg mentioned the widespread consumption of borshch by the local population; according to him, the dish was cooked in almost every household and consumed daily as both food and drink. Another early mention of borshch in Ukrainian lands comes from Orthodox polemicist Ivan Vyshenskyi from Galicia, who described the dish as a typical peasant food. In the 18th century, after the incorporation of parts of Ukraine into the Russian Empire, borshch became popular at the imperial court in Saint Petersburg. It was also mentioned in Ivan Kotliarevsky's Eneida, the pioneering work of modern Ukrainian literature, on par with halushky, another popular traditional Ukrainian dish.

Ukrainian cuisine was also strongly influenced by Cossack traditions, especially after the establishment of the Cossack Hetmanate in 1648, when Cossack starshyna replaced the old nobility as the new elite in a significant part of Ukrainian lands. Typical food consumed by Zaporozhian Cossacks consisted of milled grains and flour and included traditional Ukrainian dishes such as kasha, kulish, teteria and solomakha. The diet of the Hetmanate's Cossack elite was much more luxurious in comparison: campaigning in the Caucasus in 1726, Lubny colonel Yakiv Markovych ordered his wife in Ukraine to send him foods such as olives, butter, ham, dried beef tongue, chicken and turkeys, as well as olive oil and various appetizers. During the Cossack era beef and game in Ukraine were consumed mostly by the upper classes; the most commonly eaten meat among the lower classes was mutton.

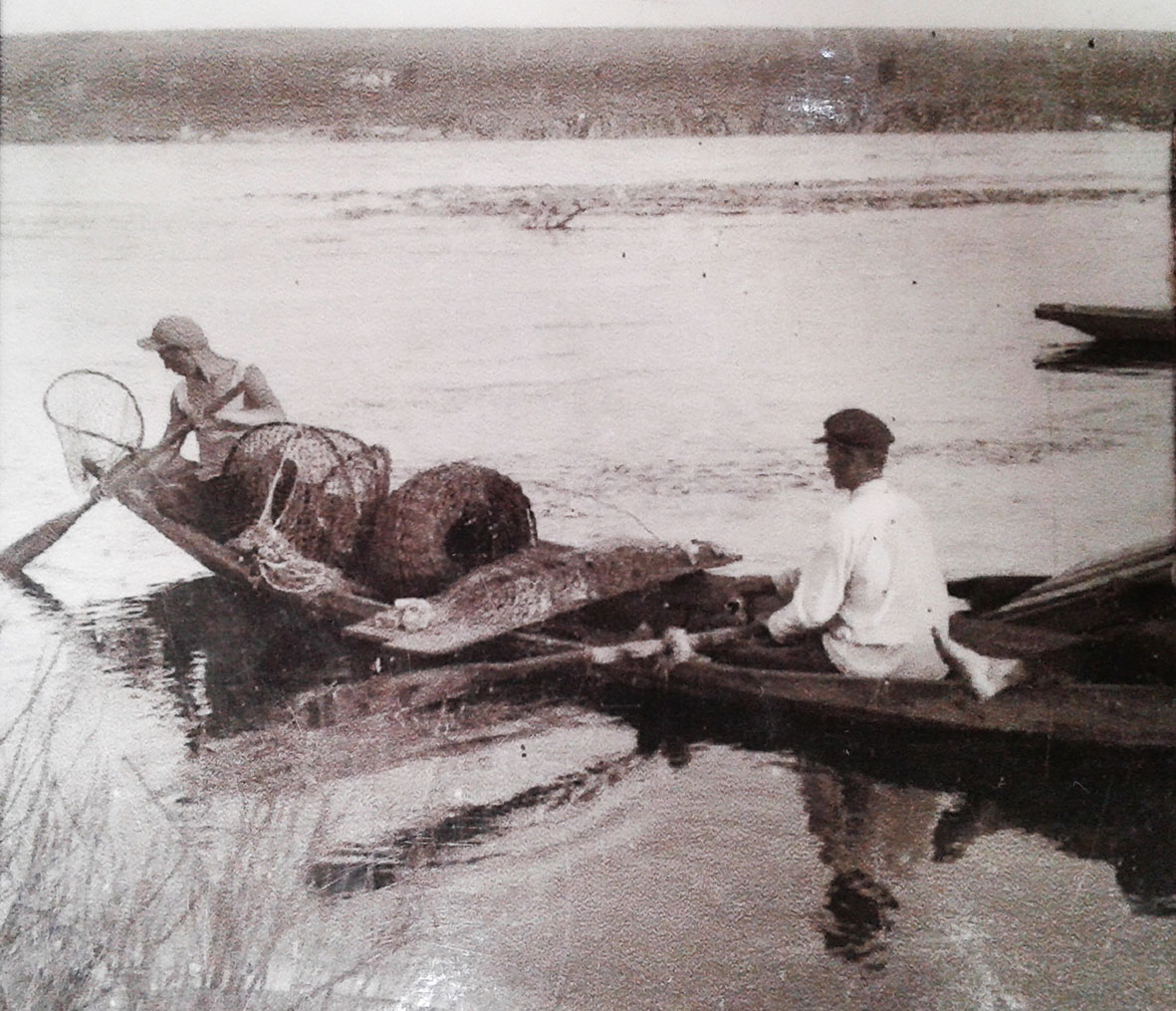
Fishermen on the Dnieper rapids, the historical homeland of Zaporozhian Cossacks, 1920s

According to a contemporary observation, due to the abundance of fasting days in the Orthodox Christian calendar, the consumption of meat in early 18th-century Ukraine was possible only during one-fourth of days per year. As a result, for most of the time meat products would be replaced with fish, which played an especially important role in the diet of Ukrainian Cossacks and other social groups. In Ivan Kotliarevsky's Eneida, sturgeon, herring and roach are mentioned among the fish consumed by the poem's heroes, who were inspired by Zaporozhian Cossacks. Ukrainian ethnographer Mykola Markevych also mentioned dishes like borshch with fish, loaches with horseradish, and cutlets made of pike or crucian carp, which were all popular among Ukrainian Cossacks. The social elite of the Hetmanate also ate imported fish and seafood such as Dutch herring, eels, flounders, lampreys, salmon, and cuttlefish. Other local fish species popular during that time included carp, catfish, common bream, and sander. Much of the fish consumed by Cossacks in Ukrainian lands was salted or dried. The fish trade between Ukraine and the Black Sea region during the Cossack era was controlled by chumaks, but much of the catch came from local rivers, such as the Dnieper and Desna, and ponds.

Dewberry, fried berries and honey, as well as drinks such as juice, tea, coffee, wine, horilka and prune brandy were mentioned by Zaporozhian Cossack colonel Yakiv Markovych in the early 18th century. Consumption of coffee was a traditional attribute of Ukrainian Cossack starshina. In the 17th century fruit confiture was a favourite treat of the monks of Kyiv Pechersk Lavra, accompanied with coffee. Sweets were traditionally made from locally grown fruit such as quince, apples and apricots. Many desserts also included honey and nuts. A signature product of Kyiv, known since the 18th century, is "dry jam", similar to succade, but with a more tender structure.

=== 18th and 19th centuries ===
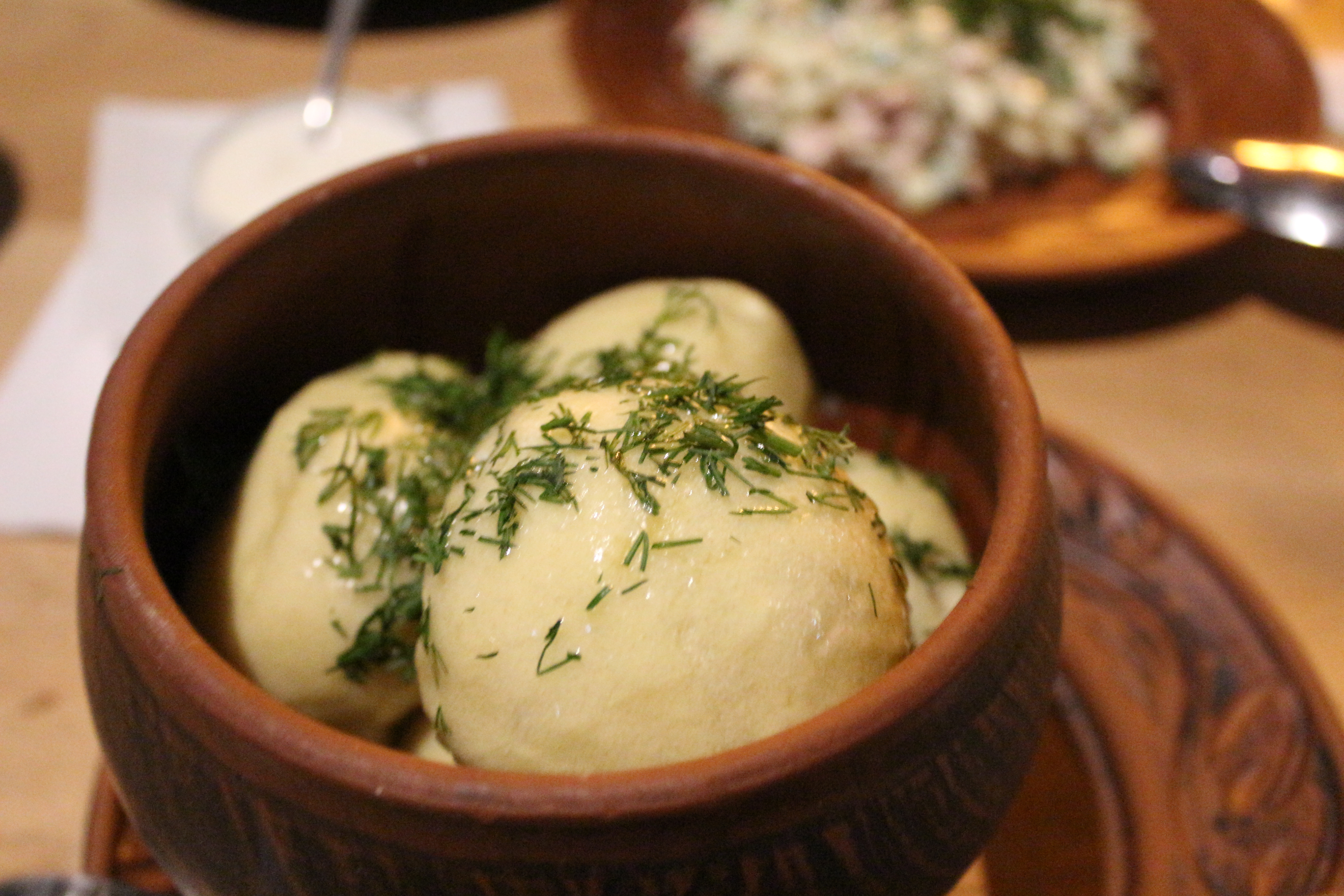
Poltava halushky, a traditional Ukrainian dish mentioned in several works of classical literature from the late 18th and 19th centuries

In the 18th century the standard diet of an inhabitant of left-bank Ukraine consisted mostly of dishes made of flour and groats (rye, buckwheat, millet and wheat), as well as borshch and other soups. Common dishes included different types of gruel (solomakha, lemishka, kulish, zubtsi, putria, teteria), halushky, varenyky, flour porridge and noodles. The most important vegetables in the diet of a commoner were beets and onions. Beef and mutton were the most popular meats, followed by pork. A universal product valued for its long storage time was salo (salted lard). Hemp oil was also commonly used in preparation of food.

Potatoes first appeared in Dnieper Ukraine in the mid-18th century. Initially grown predominantly by urban inhabitants, they were gradually introduced into rural areas as well: in 1786 potatoes were cultivated in Chernihiv, Horodnia, Hadiach, Zinkiv and Romny and several surrounding villages; by mid-19th century they were grown in all povits of Kyiv, Chernihiv and Poltava Governorates. In Kyiv alone more than 600 tons of potatoes were harvested on suburban land plots in 1845, but this was still not enough, so the city had to import one cart of potatoes per one inhabitant every year on average. Potato cultivation was most popular in less fertile regions of Northern Ukraine. In the mid-19th century a rich peasant from Chyhyryn area would consume 150 kg of potatoes per year, which superseded the average annual per capita consumption of this product in modern Ukraine. Initially potatoes would be cooked by boiling or baked; potato bread also became a popular product. In his 1860 book ethnographer Mykola Markevych mentioned several traditional dishes including potatoes, which were popular in Left-bank Ukraine, such as fried potatoes with lard, boiled potatoes and mashed potatoes with poppy seeds. In the first half of the 19th century Ukrainians started adding potatoes to soups and ukha. In 1853 the addition of potatoes to borshch was first mentioned in the area of Khorol near Poltava. By the early 20th century varenyky filled with potatoes had become a usual dish in the region of Lubny.

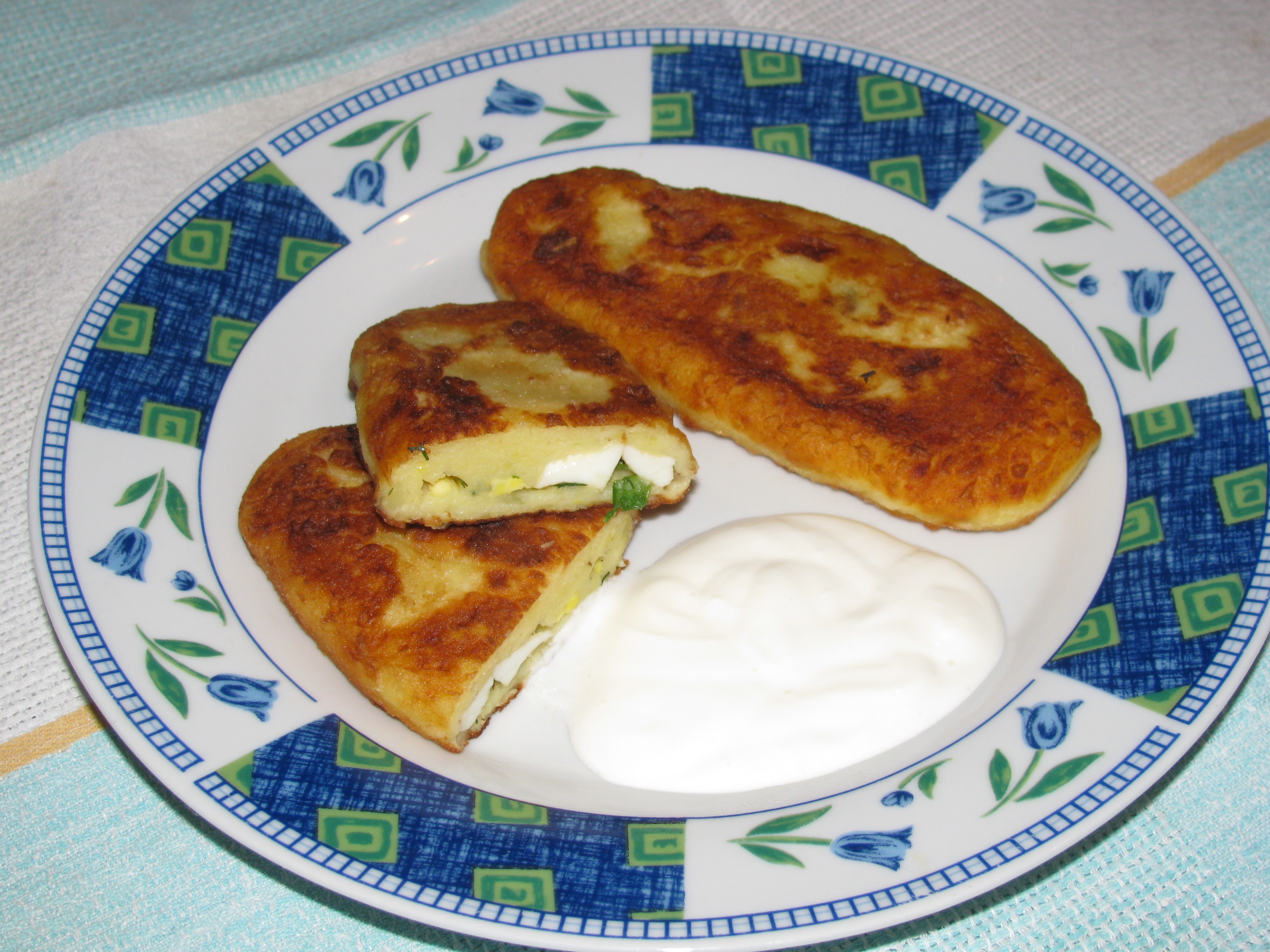
Filled kartoplianyky

Other parts of Ukrainian ethnic territory also introduced the new culture in their territories. In the 1780s potatoes appeared in the region of Sumy, and by the early 1830s had become a staple food in Sloboda Ukraine, getting mentioned in a story by Ukrainian writer Hryhorii Kvitka-Osnovianenko. Around the same time period potato cultivation became widespread in Transcarpathia. In late-19th century Galicia potatoes were even more popular than in Dnieper Ukraine: in 1888 an average local would consume 310 kg of tubers. Memoirs of Ukrainian publicist Mykhailo Drahomanov mention some common Galician dishes of that time, which included potato soup and kartoplianyky (potato cutlets); the latter could also be consumed with jam as a dessert. In Southern Ukraine potatoes were less popular, as the region's natural environment allowed for more extensive grain cultivation. Among the local population only urban inhabitants and German colonists were known for growing the culture. Potatoes also became an important source for alcohol production in Ukraine.

Another new product introduced in Ukrainian lands during the 17-18th centuries was rice. Initially imported from territories under Ottoman control, in Ukrainian lands that culture was known at that time as "Saracen millet" (Ukrainian: Сарацинське/сорочинське пшоно). Due to its high price, until the mid-19th century rice would be available only to richer strata of the Ukrainian society. In 1768 Zaporozhian Cossack otaman Petro Kalnyshevsky mentioned rice in the list of products stolen from his residence. Recipes with rice widespread during that era included other expensive foods and spices such as almond, saffron, cane sugar, raisins and prunes. Rice served as an ingredient of soups and sweets, as well as a filling for poultry dishes. On Christmas richer families would also use rice for their kutia instead of the more traditional wheat grains. In Ukraine rice remained a luxury product until the Soviet era, when mass cultivation of the cereal started in southern parts of the country (Kherson, Odesa and Crimea).

Among other important cultures which became widespread in Ukraine during the 18th and 19th centuries, enriching its cuisine, were cucumbers and aubergines. The tradition of pickling cucumbers is attributed to Greek merchants, who were provided freedom of taxation and self-government by Ukrainian hetman Bohdan Khmelnytsky. The most notable centre of cucumber production in Ukraine has been Nizhyn. After 1787 Nizhyn cucumbers were supplied to the court of Empress Catherine II of Russia, and by 1897 they were exported to 56 countries around the world. Unlike cucumbers, aubergines enjoyed only a limited degree of popularity, being consumed, among others, in the region of Kharkiv, but remaining practically unknown in Galicia.

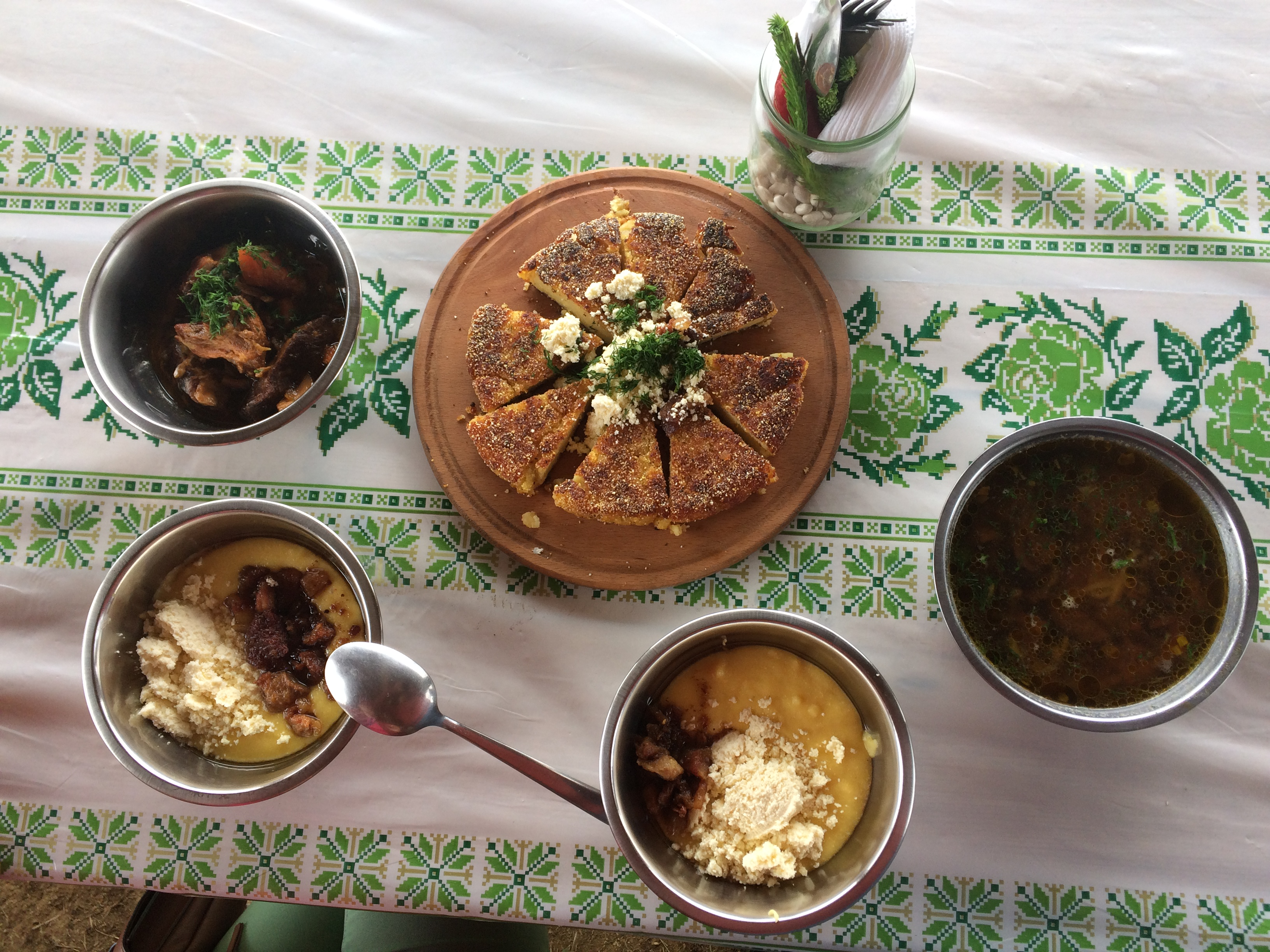
Traditional dishes of Hutsuls from the Carpathian region, including banosh

In the 19th century Ukrainian lands saw the introduction of sunflowers and maize, which form an important part of the popular diet in the country nowadays. Maize cultivation spread to Ukraine from modern-day Moldova and Romania and became most popular in the western region, especially in the Carpathians. Maize porridges such as banosh, kulesha and mamaliga are still characteristic for the cuisine of southwestern Ukraine. Other common cultures which appeared in Ukrainian lands in the 19th and early 20th centuries were tomatoes and bell peppers. The recipe of borshch with tomato paste, which is nowadays standard for many Ukrainian households, became common only in the early 20th century: previously the dish had traditionally been made with fermented beets.

In the late 19th century Ukraine became a centre of industrial production of sunflower oil, which swiftly replaced traditional plant oils, including olive oil, which historically had been imported from Greece. Due to the growth of sugar industry, connected with the names of such families as Tereshchenko, Symyrenko, Yakhnenko, Branicki, Brodsky and Bobrinsky, during the 19th century Ukraine became one of the major centres of sugar beet production.

Another historical Ukrainian speciality, which enjoyed popularity in the 18-19th centuries were plums, which would be dried or pickled in honey. The most well-known centre of plum production in Ukraine was Opishnia, and local produce would be supplied to the tsar's court and exported abroad.

In parallel to the emergence of Ukrainian ethnic cuisine, the 19th century became a period of development for urban gastronomy. Concentration of capital in big cities led to the opening of numerous restaurants and coffee houses offering expensive and exotic dishes both of local and foreign origin, such as oysters, caviar, champagne, pineapples and ice cream.

=== Modern era ===
==== Soviet Union ====
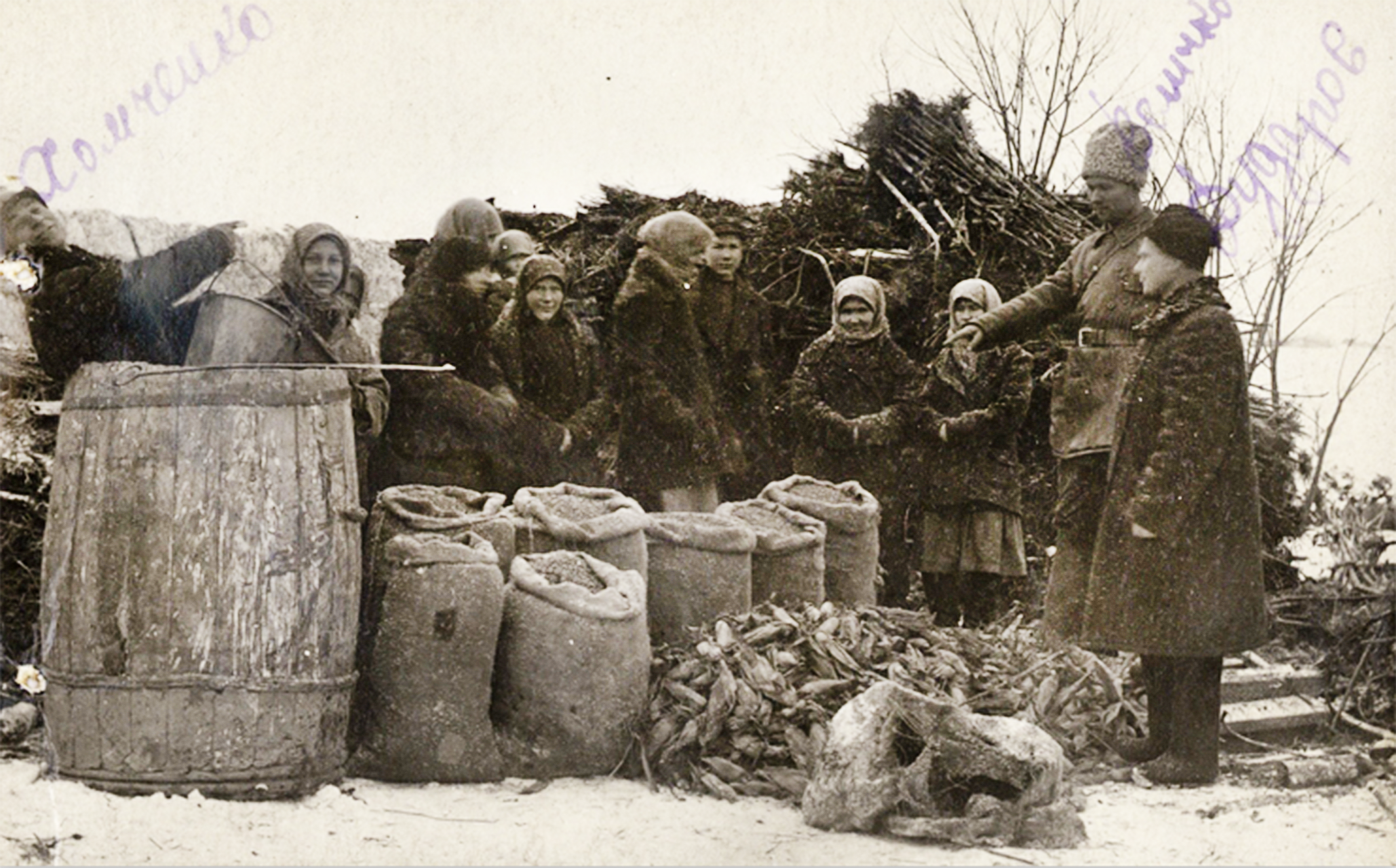
Seizure of grain and vegetables from peasants in Odesa Oblast during the Holodomor, 1932

The Revolution of 1917 and establishment of the Soviet Union had a big impact on the food culture in Ukraine. Following a short period of relative normalization under the New Economic Policy, the years of Holodomor and Second World War radically changed the popular attitude to food among Ukrainians: from now on, dishes acquired a purely utilitarian meaning, and many traditional recipes of national cuisine were revised in order to simplify the process of their preparation. Famine and lack of products in major cities of the Soviet Union led to the introduction of ration stamps, which were rated according to social class, with preference being given to workers. As a result of that system, taste lost its importance as a major criterion, and most people had to suffice themselves with their rations or with goods they could find in stores. With the exception of NEP era, such attitude to food became standard for the Soviet society.

During the Holodomor famine of 1932–1933, mass confiscation of food by Soviet authorities forced many Ukrainians to consume ersatz foods in order to survive. Popular "dishes" of that time included pancakes made of powdered corn cob and acacia bloom, potato starch, nettle soup, bread baked with the addition of pomace, beets, potato peels, straw, tree bark, grass and other products which could be gathered in the nature. Many starving peasants would be forced to eat snowdrop bulbs and acorns. Even dead animals would be consumed during that time, and in many villages cats, dogs, hedgehogs and even storks and cranes would be hunted down by locals and consumed for their meat. Some would even resort to eating turtles. The break of taboos as a result of the famine eventually led to cases of cannibalism.

Deficit of goods led to the introduction of new products into the popular diet: for example, during the 1930s the government promoted the consumption of soy and rabbit meat, meanwhile during the 1960s citizens were encouraged to eat maize dishes. At the same time, starting from the early 1930s Soviet food industry was revolutionized by the introduction of Western technology, which allowed to start mass production of canned products, mayonnaise, sausages, juices, condensed milk, ice cream and other goods. Bread, which until that time had been usually baked at home, was for the first time produced industrially.

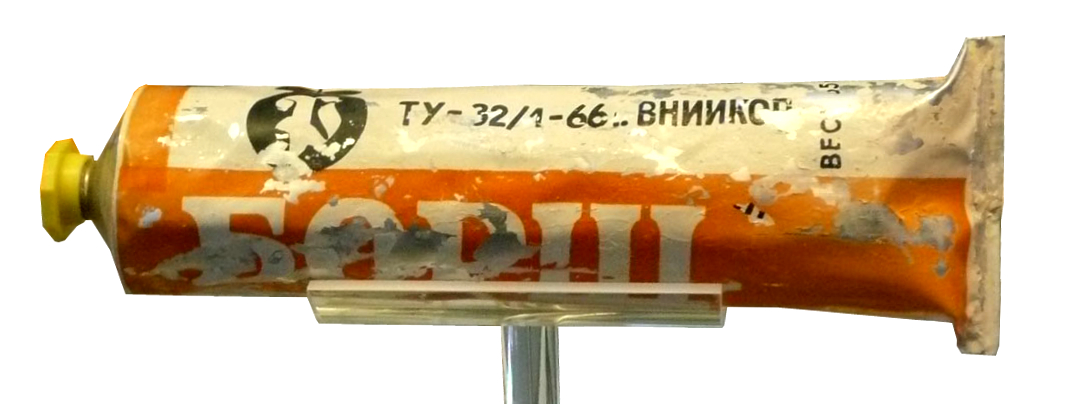
A tube of canned borshch produced for consumption by Soviet cosmonauts

General standardization of norms led to the introduction of numerous local recipes into the canon of Soviet cuisine, among them Georgian kharcho, Caucasian shashlik and Central Asian plov. Ukrainian cuisine also played a big role in this process. According to a publication of the Soviet Trade Ministry, Ukrainian dishes such as borshch, pampushky, halushky, varenyky and flatbreads, meat products, poultry and sausages, fruit, vegetables and milk products like syrnyky and ryazhanka, as well as fruit and honey drinks, enjoyed great popularity among consumers around the Soviet Union and Eastern Bloc. During the Soviet period some dishes, for example mlyntsi, were adopted as standard festive foods during holidays such as Masnytsia. At the same time, many traditional Ukrainian recipes, for example fermented cereal dishes like teteria and putria, urda (powdered hempseed), lemishka, varenyky with lard, came out of use under the Soviet rule; since the 1970s, beetroot kvas has been replaced with canned tomatoes or tomato paste as a basic ingredient of borshch.

In order to introduce new culinary approaches, in 1939 Soviet authorities published The Book of Tasty and Healthy Food, which served as an advertisement of new Soviet food industry production and included standardized recipes. The book's publication is considered to have contributed to the rise in popularity of salads, which hadn't been widespread during the Russian imperial era. Salad recipes contained in the first edition included products such as lettuce, romaine and nuts; but as those were unavailable for an average citizen, the second edition from 1952 only included recipes using tomatoes, cucumbers, cabbage and radish. One of the causes for the popularity of salads was the deficit of meat, which became especially acute starting from the 1930s. A popular condiment for salads was mayonnaise, which could also be used to make deviled eggs. Other ingredients for salads which were popular in the Soviet Union included green peas, canned crabs and vinegar. A popular recipe was "winter salad" made from potatoes and carrots, as those products were usually available in Soviet shops. An important part of daily food practices in the Soviet Union was soup. Broth could be prepared from various products, including canned fish and bone, which made that dish available for all Soviet citizens.

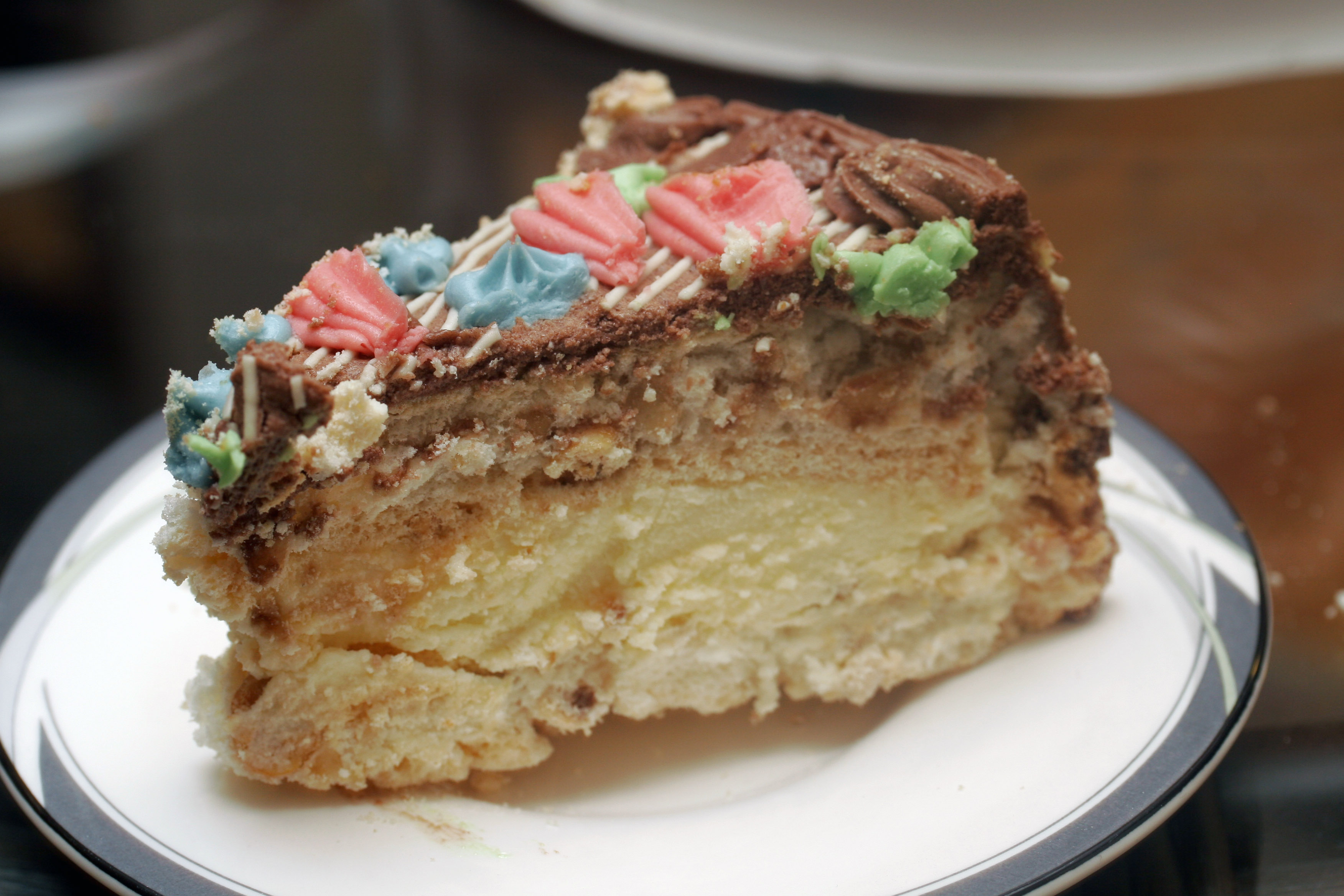
Slice of Kyiv cake

Confectionery products in the Soviet Union were generally made of wheat flour. Most recipes included yeast as baking powder. Among popular holiday foods were sprats. Many festive foods were cooked according to own family recipes, but others could derive from standard cookbooks. Popular dishes which spread during the Soviet era and became symbols of Ukrainian cuisine are Chicken Kiev and Kyiv cake.

An important part of Soviet food culture was represented by catering. Most Soviet restaurants cooked food according to the same recipes as those contained in The Book of Tasty and Healthy Food. Local culinary traditions were almost totally ignored, and the same list of standard dishes, such as borshch, chicken Kiev and salad with mayonnaise, could be ordered at restaurants in Kyiv, Leningrad or Tallinn. This could be seen as a continuation of pre-revolutionary trends, in which restaurant cooks in the Russian Empire tended to simplify foreign recipes. The new type of popular cuisine, which appeared during the Soviet era, emulated well-known European dishes, but used totally different ingredients. One example of this trend is the Olivier salad, whose recipe was made more available to the general population by replacing crayfish with carrots, and capers with pickled cucumbers. A peculiar practice in Soviet cuisine was the change of original names of many dishes, as a result of which consommé became known as broth, chicken Kiev - as "butter-filled chicken cutlet", meanwhile Soviet sparkling wines became known as "champagne".

Starting with the introduction of New Economic Policy during the 1920s, Soviet authorities started organizing a network of canteens, which were seen as an instrument of social emancipation of women. Residential buildings designed during that time had the size of their kitchens reduced, as it was believed that home cooking would soon become a thing of the past. Canteens were the most economical places to have a meal, but the quality of food, service and general atmosphere in such establishments were in many cases substandard. Following the Second World War, numerous restaurants, buffets and cafés started appearing in major Soviet cities, including Kyiv; meanwhile canteens were viewed by the broader public with skepticism, and frequently served as gathering places for alcoholics. By the 1960s the image of woman as hostess in popular Soviet culture had been rehabilitated, and eating at home was once again seen as a normal practice. During the 1970s, most Soviet restaurants were located in hotels. Some establishments attempted to diversify their menus by including dishes like schnitzel, but in general the view of food as a source of pleasure was seen as a relic of bourgeois past. Most people visited restaurants only in special cases, for example during birthdays or weddings.

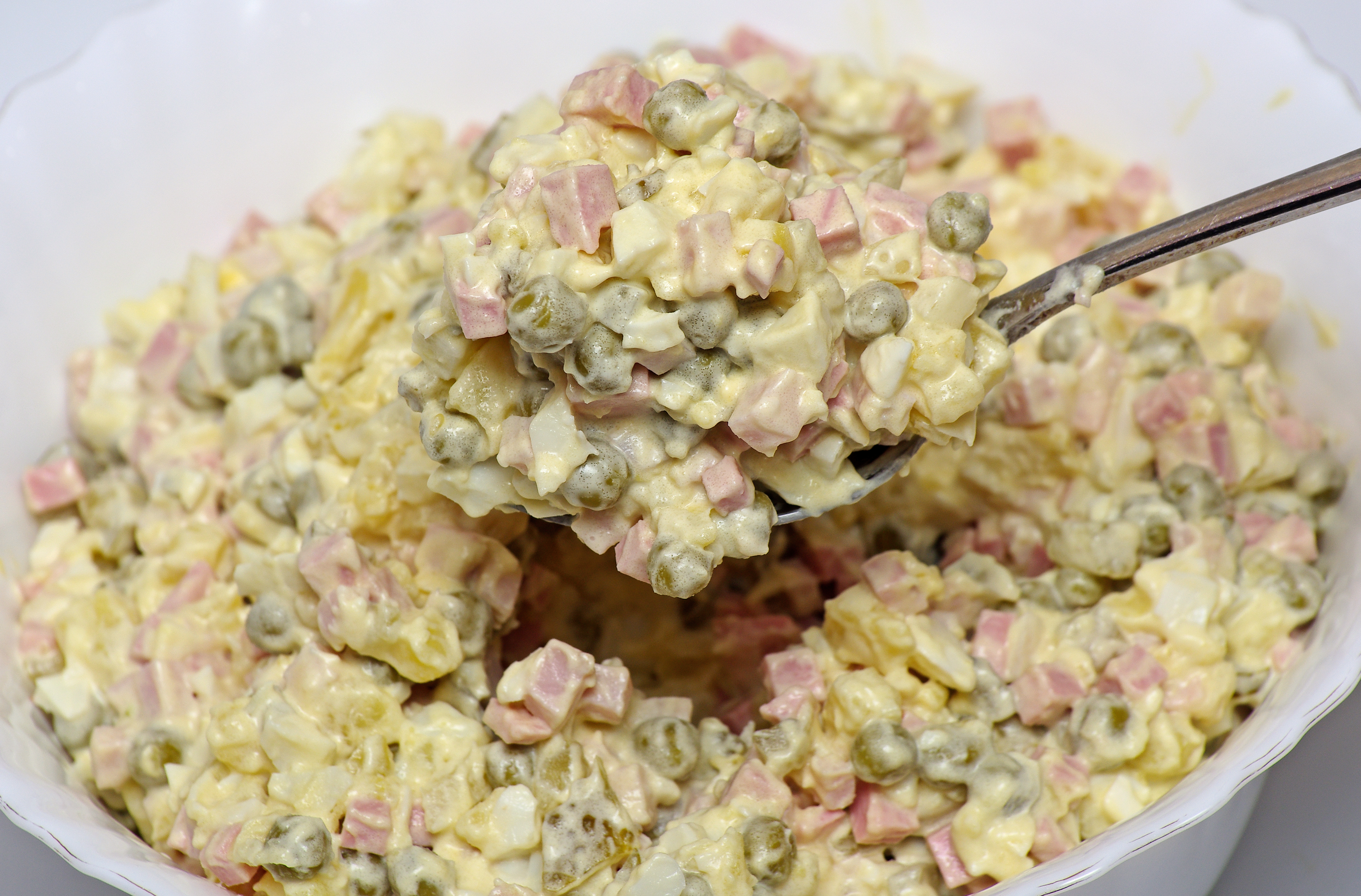
Olivier salad

According to restaurateur Yevhen Klopotenko, the Soviet era played a decisive role in the history of Ukrainian cuisine, and as many as 90% of all dishes considered Ukrainian today in fact have Soviet origins. The Soviet regime attempted to create one Soviet nation under its rule, and saw unification of cultural traditions, including cuisine, as one of the ways to achieve that goal. Modern Ukrainian food culture has preserved numerous elements of its Soviet past. Many canteens from that era still operate, offering a standard variety of typical Soviet foods, such as boiled potatoes, vinegret and "Stolichny" salad, and some even continue following the Soviet-introduced tradition of "fish days". Mayonnaise, olivier salad and deviled eggs remain popular festive foods in many Ukrainian families. Other dishes of Soviet origin which are still widespread in modern Ukraine are shuba and mimosa salad. Even some dishes which have their origins in traditional Ukrainian cuisine, for example kholodets, deruny and cutlets had their recipes changed under the Soviet rule. Among the few areas where Soviet cuisine failed to suppress authentic Ukrainian culinary traditions were wake ceremonies and weddings.

==== Ukrainian diaspora ====
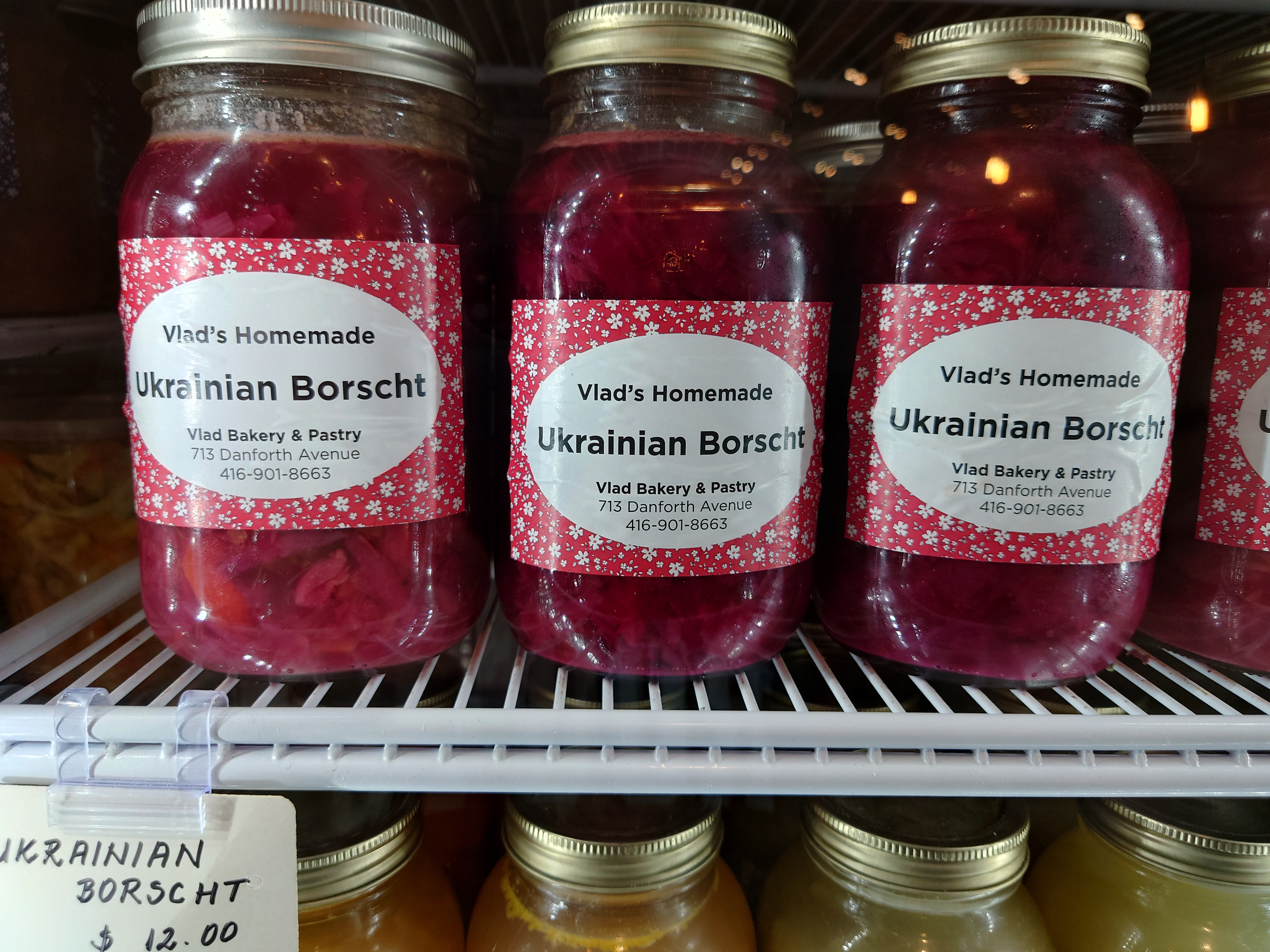
Ukrainian borscht in a Mason jar sold in Toronto

Mass emigration of Ukrainians to the United States after World War II led to the establishment of Ukrainian cuisine across the ocean. This process saw the fusion between traditional Ukrainian recipes and modern American cooking. Many Ukrainian immigrant families adopted local practices of the new country, organizing picnics and baking turkey for Thanksgiving Day. Nevertheless, typical Ukrainian dishes such as borshch, varenyky, holubtsi and pierogi retained their role as signature dishes among emgrants. An important source on Ukrainian diaspora cuisine is the magazine Nashe Zhyttia ("Our Life"), founded by the Ukrainian National Women's League of America, which was published between 1944 and 2018.

==== Independent Ukraine ====
After Ukraine declared independence, Ukrainian culinary traditions started to be influenced by modern global trends, such as the rise in popularity of convenience foods and dehydrated products, for example instant noodles. A popular Ukrainian brand of instant noodles is Mivina, established by Vietnamese businessman Phạm Nhật Vượng in 1995 in Kharkiv. The product became so popular, that eventually all instant noodles in Ukraine started to be known under the brand name. In 2010 the company which had been producing the noodles was bought by Nestlé, which also acquired several other popular Ukrainian food producers such as Svitoch and Torchyn. Due to the Russian invasion of Ukraine, the production facilities of Mivina had to be moved to Volyn Oblast. The noodles also appeared in Germany, France and Great Britain under the brand Maggi.

Ukrainian cuisine of modern times has witnessed the decline of some traditions, but many authentic elements have been preserved. The use of convenience and ready-made foods has led to a decrease in the number of people who cook at home, however some traditional foods such as korovai are still common during wedding celebrations and other festive occasions. In contrast to Soviet times, kitchen has once again become an important part of private living space for Ukrainian families. Emergence of new cooking technologies such as microwave oven, electric ovens and multicookers led to a rising popularity of simple recipes. At the same time, traditional ovens have disappeared in private houses, but reemerged in restaurants specializing in authentic Ukrainian cuisine.

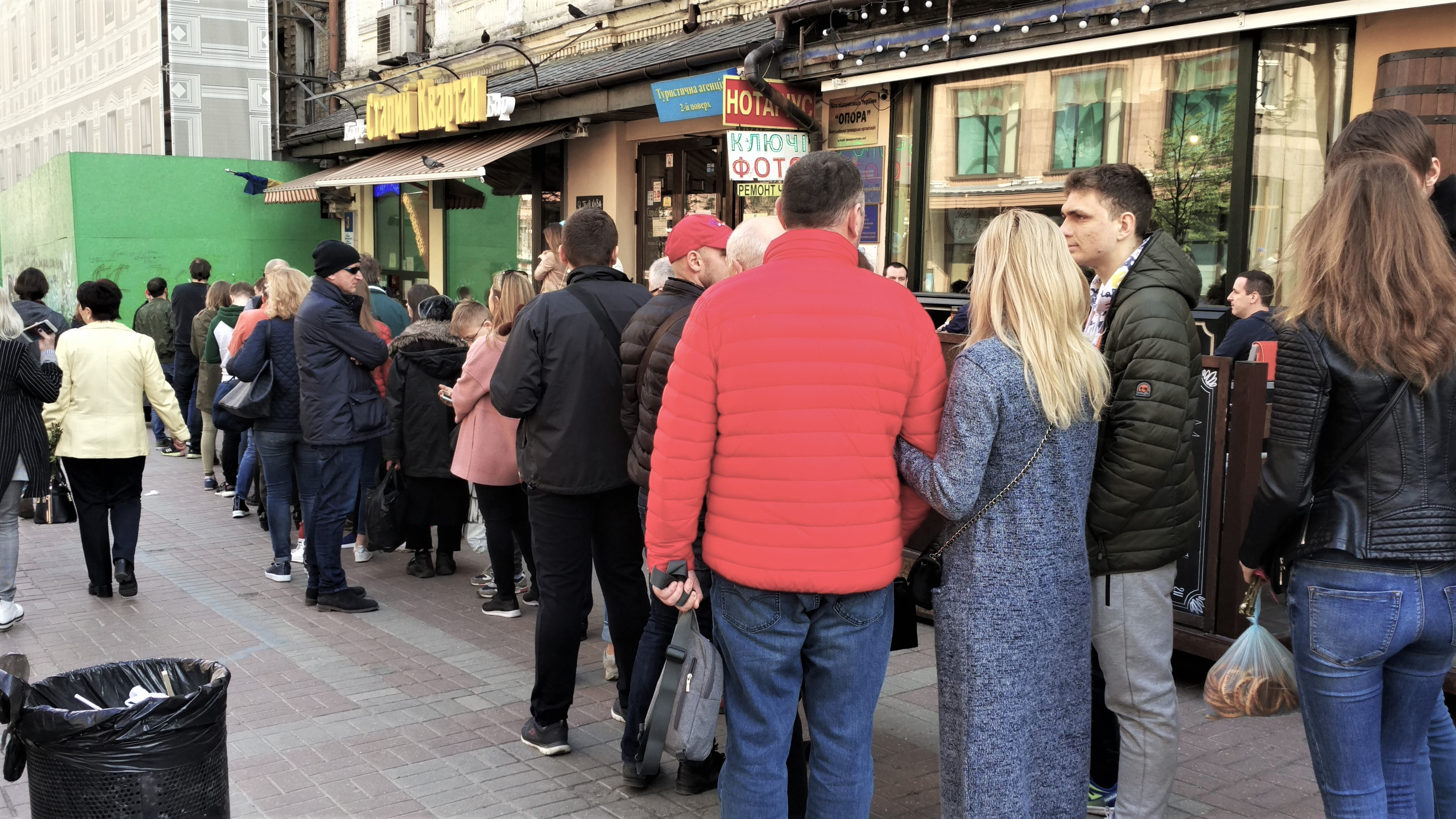
People standing in line to a snack bar in central Kyiv

The fall of the Soviet Union with its lack of competition and directive approach to cooking brought more freedom for cooks, who now have a chance to realize themselves in private business. The development of Ukrainian gastronomy has led to the reemergence of seasonal products, and the taste and outward appearance of food have once again become an important factor. Another trend in modern Ukrainian cuisine is the increase of consumption of meat products, which have become more available to the general population. At the same time, an opposite process can also be observed with an increase in the number of vegetarians.

In the modern world Ukrainian cuisine is associated with a limited number of recipes, such as chicken Kiev or borshch. Numerous restaurants of Ukrainian cuisine are active among the diaspora in countries such as the United States and Canada. Nevertheless, in many parts of the world Ukrainian cuisine is seen through a lens of Russian-imposed narratives, and is represented in a simplified manner with the inclusion of post-Soviet dishes from other nations formerly part of the USSR. In order to form a distinct Ukrainian culinary image in the world, volunteers in cooperation with the Ukrainian Institute have contributed to the publishing of a book on Ukrainian food and its history, which is available online.

== Dishes of the cultural heritage of Ukraine ==
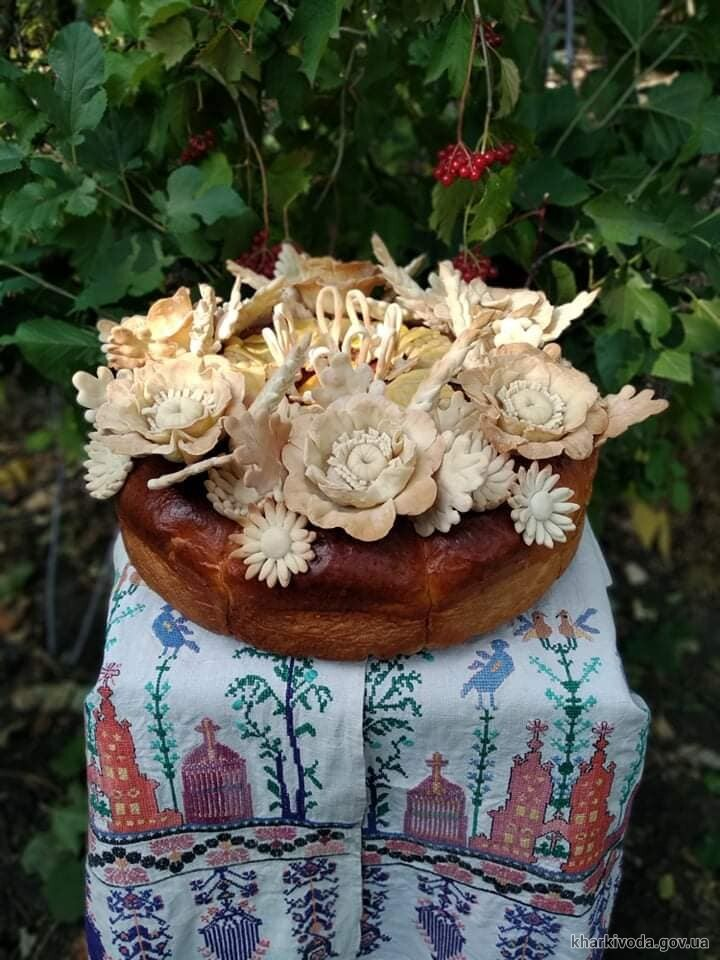
Sakhnovshchyna korovai

The National Register of Elements of Cultural Heritage of Ukraine includes the following Ukrainian dishes:

- Avdiivka kasha – sweet rice porridge cooked with milk, eggs, and butter from Avdiivka;
- Borscht – sour soup usually cooked with beetroots;
- Buzynnyk – dessert made from elderberries;
- Çiberek and yantıq – Crimean Tatar fried turnovers with minced meat;
- Christmas prianyky from Slobozhanshchyna – decorated gingerbread cookies;
- Et ayaklak – Crimean Karaite pie with meat;
- Holubtsi – cabbage rolls;
- Hutsul bryndzya – Hutsul sheep cheese;
- Lekvar – Transcarpathian sugar-free plum jam;
- Milina – Bessarabian cheese pie;
- Platsynda – Bessarabian cheese cake;
- Psatyr – ritual bread of Pryazovia Greeks;
- Sakhnovshchyna korovai – ritual bread from Sakhnovshchyna;
- Yavoriv pie – pie with a potato and buckwheat filling from Yavoriv;
- Zasypana kapusta – dish made of cabbage and porridge;
- Zelekivka zlyvanka – porridge with meat and potatoes from Zelekivka, Luhansk Oblast. The liquid and solid parts of this dish are served separately;
- Zozulya – sweet porridge made of millet and poppy seeds.

== Soups ==
=== Borscht ===
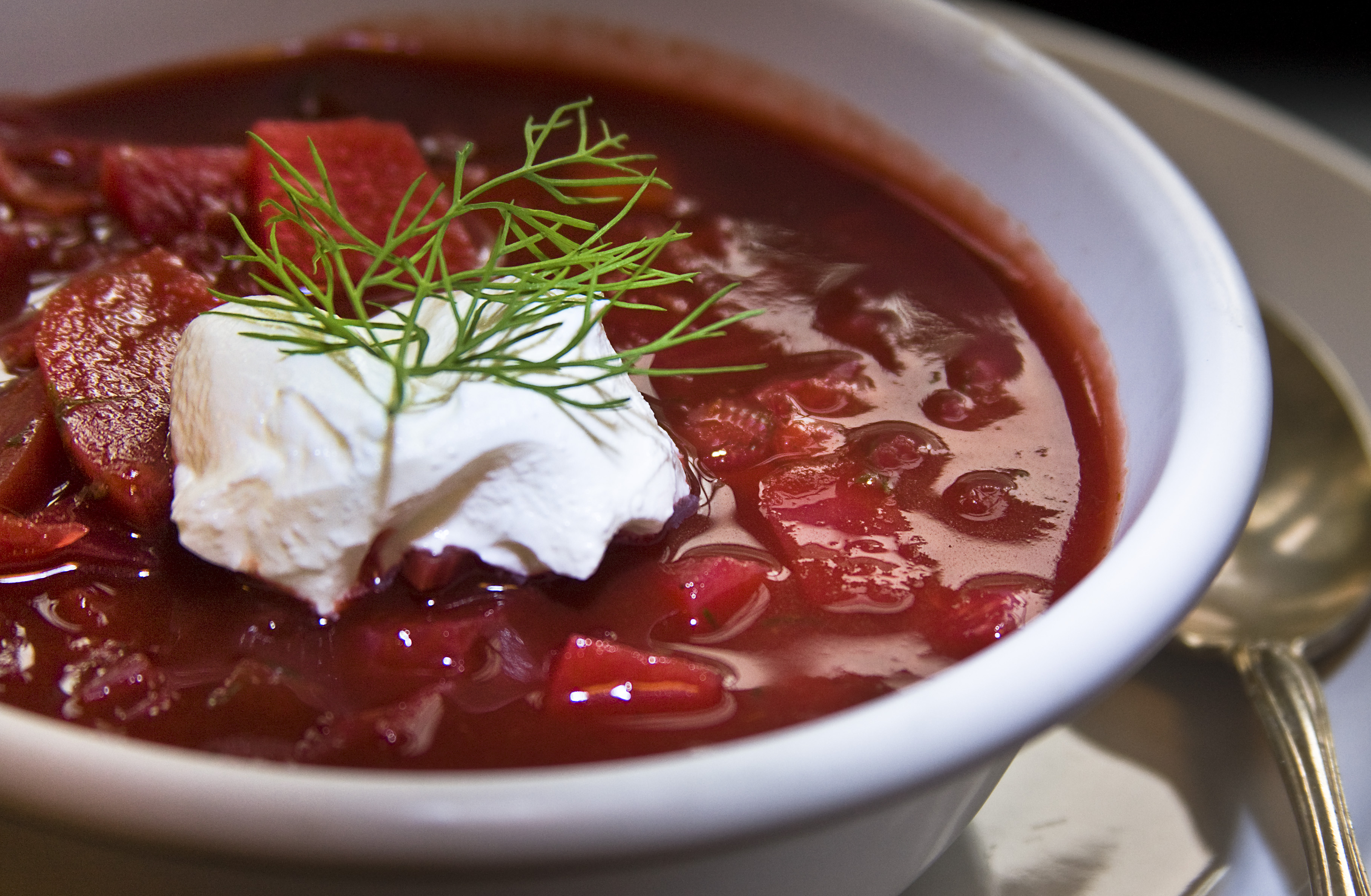
Ukrainian red borscht with smetana (sour cream)

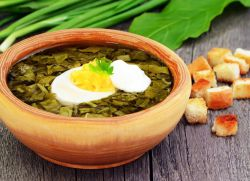
Green borshch with sorrels and egg

Although the word borscht usually refers to the red variety, it may also refer to other sour soups that may not have any beets in them.

- Chervonyi borshch (red borscht; usually simply called borshch) is a vegetable soup made out of beets, cabbage, potatoes, tomatoes, carrots, onions, garlic, and dill. There are about 30 varieties of Ukrainian borscht. It may include meat or fish. Although the modern variety is usually soured with tomatoes or tomato-derived products (such as tomato paste), traditionally beet kvas was used instead.
- Zelenyi borshch (green borscht) or shchavlevyi borshch (sorrel soup): water- or broth-based soup with sorrel and various vegetables, served with chopped hard-boiled egg and sour cream.
- Kholodnyi borshch (cold borscht) or kholodnyk: vegetable and beet soup blended with sour dairy (sour cream, soured milk, kefir, or yogurt), served cold with a hard-boiled egg.
- Bilyi borshch (white borscht): refers to different soups depending on the region. In southern Podolia, white borscht is cooked with fresh sugar beets, beans, and vegetables. In the Hutsul region, it is cooked with fermented white beets and their liquid (kvas), onions, carrots, sour cream, and Carpathian oregano. In Polesia, it includes sugar beets, beet kvas, cabbage, mushrooms, potatoes and fresh herbs. White borscht may also refer to a żur-like soup from neighboring Poland.

In 2022, during the Russian invasion of Ukraine, Ukrainian borscht was included in UNESCO's Representative List of the Intangible Cultural Heritage of Humanity in Need of Urgent Safeguarding.

=== Other soups ===
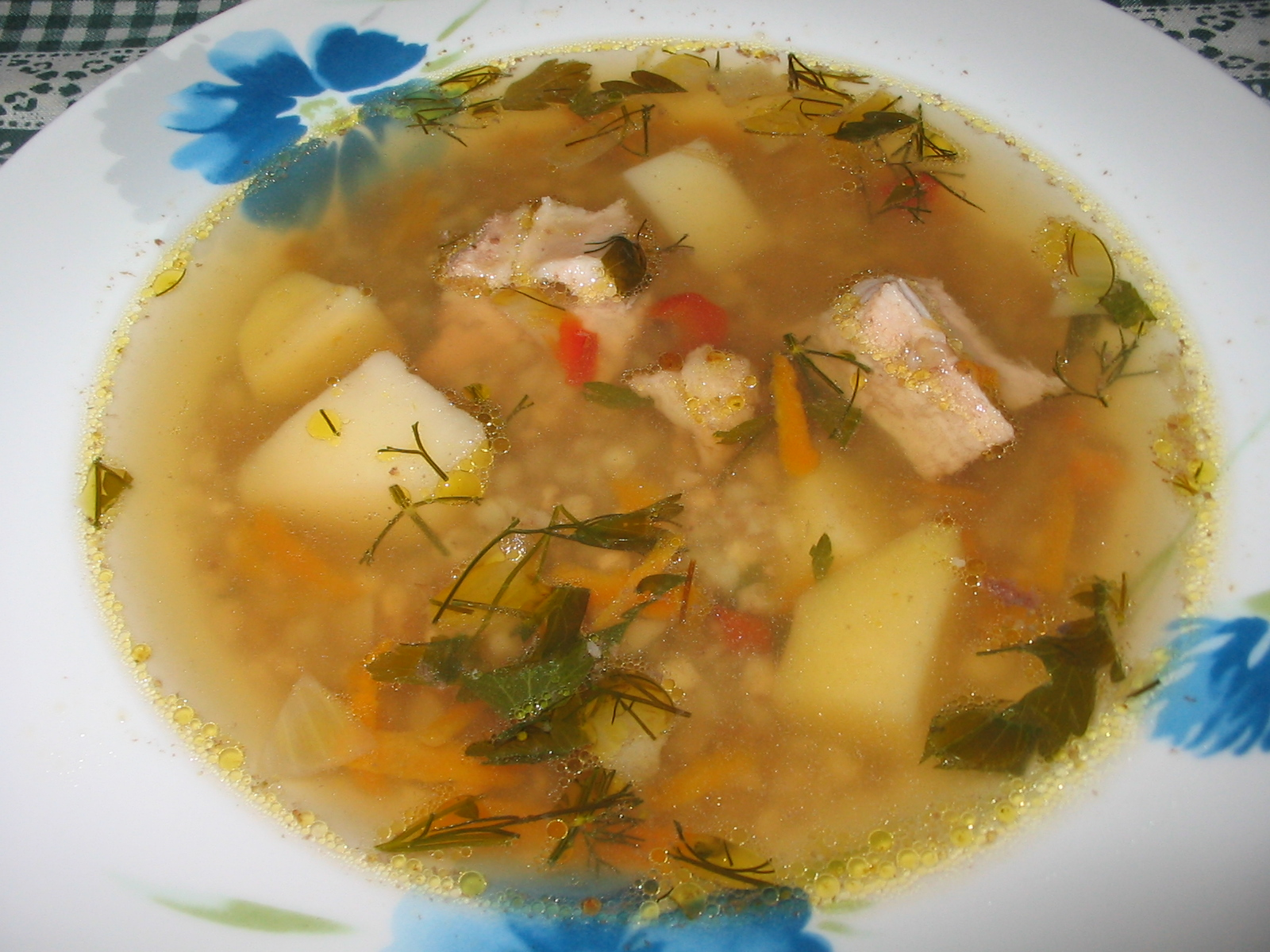
Buckwheat soup

- Horokhovyi sup: soup made with dried peas and vegetables, often served with pieces of toasted bread.
- Hrechanyi sup: soup made with buckwheat, vegetables, and sometimes meat.
- Kapusniak: soup made with cabbage, pork, salo, beans, and served with smetana (sour cream).
- Rosolnyk: soup with pickled cucumbers.
- Solianka: thick, spicy and sour soup made with meat, fish or mushrooms and various vegetables and pickles.
- Yushka: clear soup; the most common variety — rybna yushka (fish yushka) is made from various types of fish such as carp, bream, wels catfish, or even ruffe. Another common variety is hrybna yushka (clear mushroom soup).
- Zatirka: vegetable or meat soup with dough pellets that are formed by rubbing the dough with two hands.

== Salads and appetizers ==
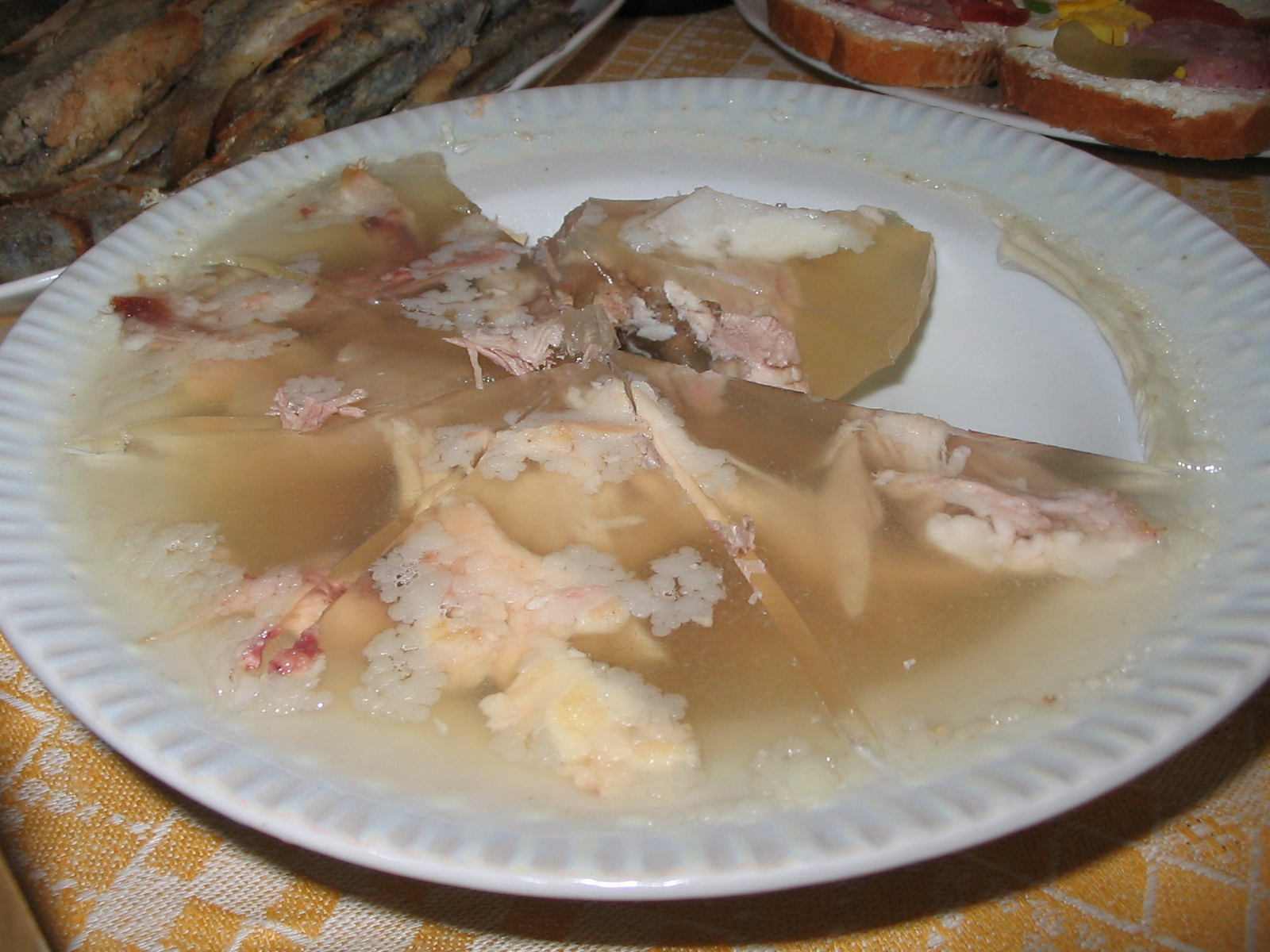
Kholodets

- Brynza or bryndza: white cow or sheep cheese from the Carpathians.
- Kovbasa: various kinds of smoked or boiled pork, beef or chicken sausage. One specific variety is krovianka, the blood sausage.
- Salo: cured fatback. Usually served sliced, with pieces of bread, onion, and horseradish or hot mustard sauce. It may also be fried (shkvarky) or boiled.
- Kaviar or ikra: caviar, served on top of buttered slices of bread.
- Kholodets: aspic (studenets) made with meat or fish (zalyvna ryba).
- Olivier: salad made out of cooked and chopped potatoes, dill pickles, boiled chopped eggs, cooked and chopped chicken or ham, chopped onions, peas, mixed with mayonnaise.
- Vinehret: salad with cooked and shredded beets, sauerkraut, cooked and chopped potatoes, onions, and carrots, sometimes pickles mixed with some sunflower oil and salt.

== Bread and grain ==
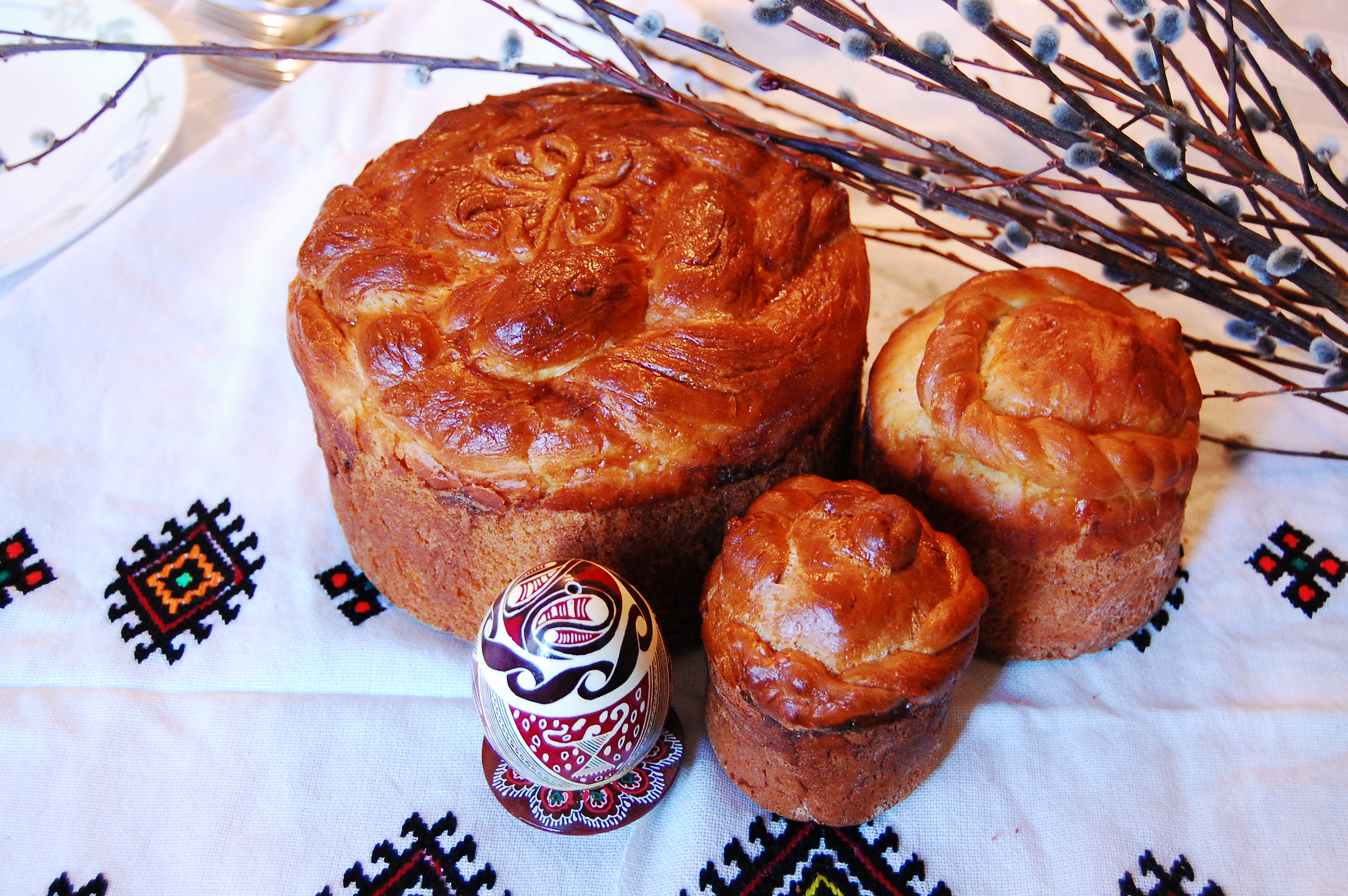
Traditional Ukrainian paska

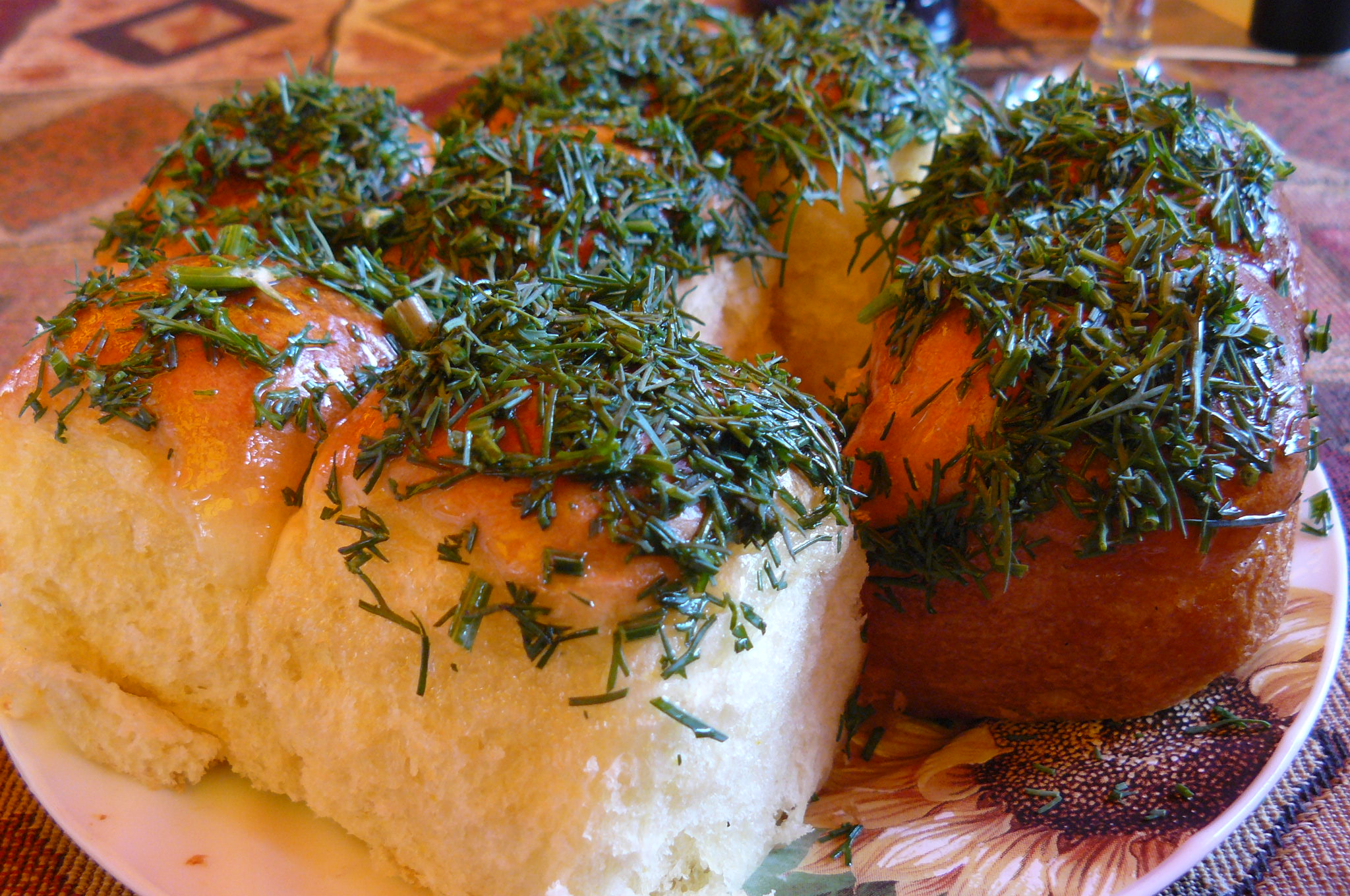
Pampushky with dill

Bread and wheat products are important to Ukrainian cuisine. The country has been considered one of the traditional "breadbaskets" of the world. French author Honoré de Balzac claimed to have counted 77 local varieties of bread during his visit to Ukraine in 1848. Decorations on the top of Ukrainian bread loaves can be elaborate for celebrations.

- Babka: Easter bread, usually a sweet dough with raisins and other dried fruit. It is usually baked in a tall, cylindrical form.
- Bublyk: ring-shaped bread roll made from dough that has been boiled before baking. It is similar to bagel, but usually somewhat bigger and with a wider hole.
- Kolach: ring-shaped bread typically served at Christmas and funerals. The dough is braided, often with three strands representing the Holy Trinity. The braid is then shaped into a circle (circle = kolo in Ukrainian) representing the circle of life and family.
- Korovai: a round, braided bread, similar to the kolach. It is most often baked for weddings and its top decorated with birds and periwinkle.
- Palianytsia: regular baked bread (famously difficult to pronounce for non-Ukrainian speakers).
- Savory pampushky: soft, fluffy bread portions, or deep-fried pieces of dough, topped with garlic butter.
- Paska: traditional rich pastry baked on Easter.

== Main courses ==
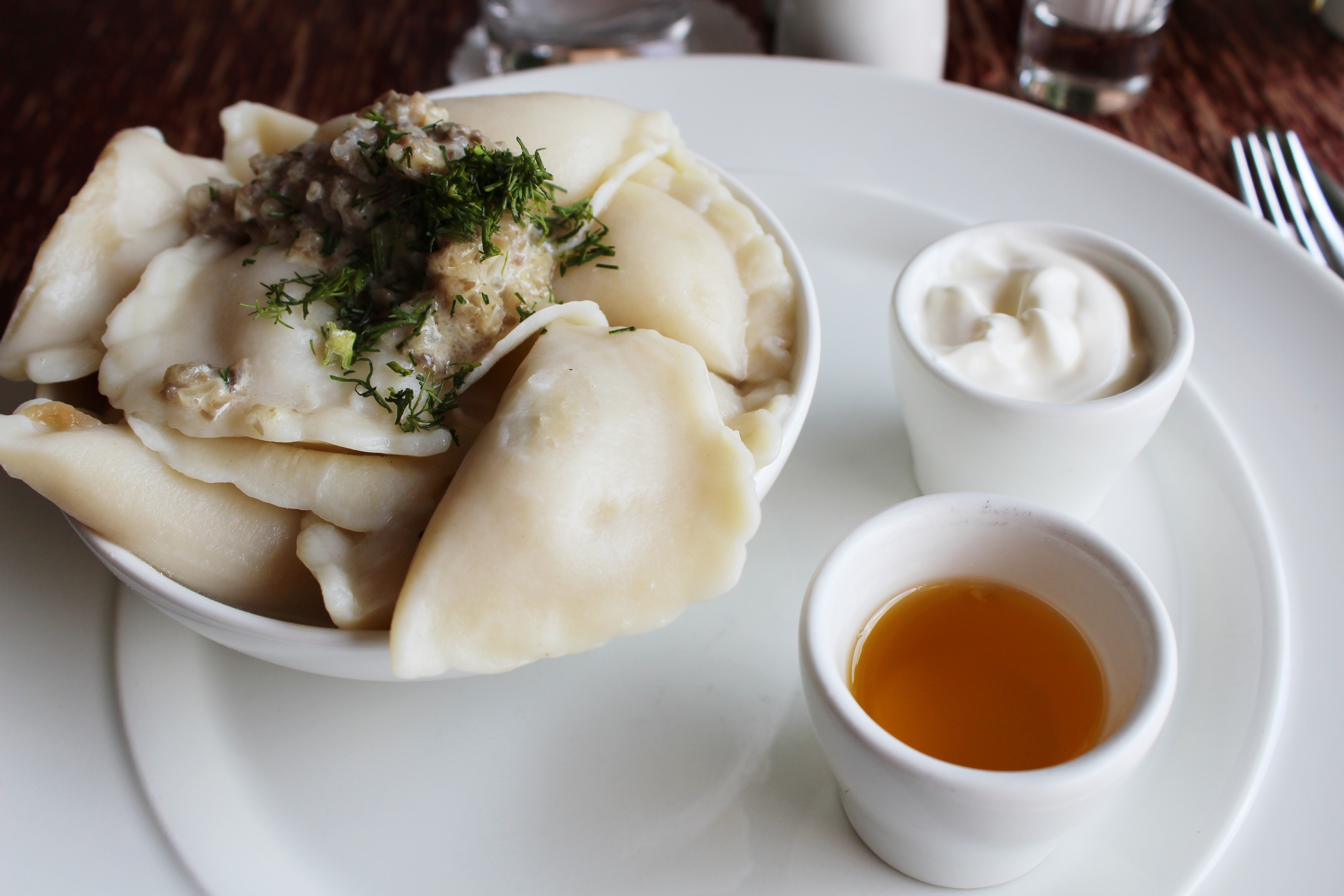
Varenyky stuffed with meat, served with fried onions and sour cream

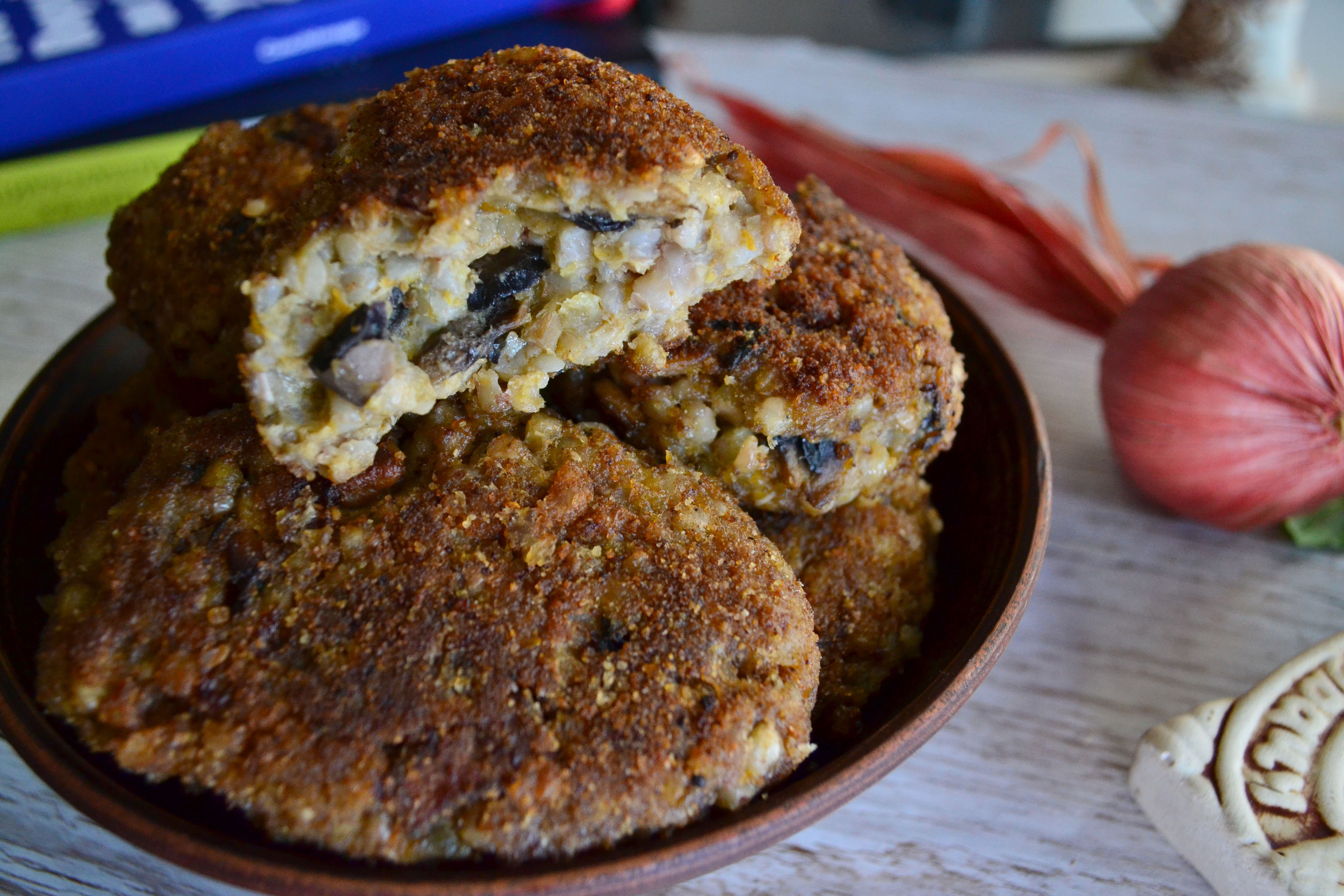
Hrechanyky - buckwheat porridge cutlets with filling

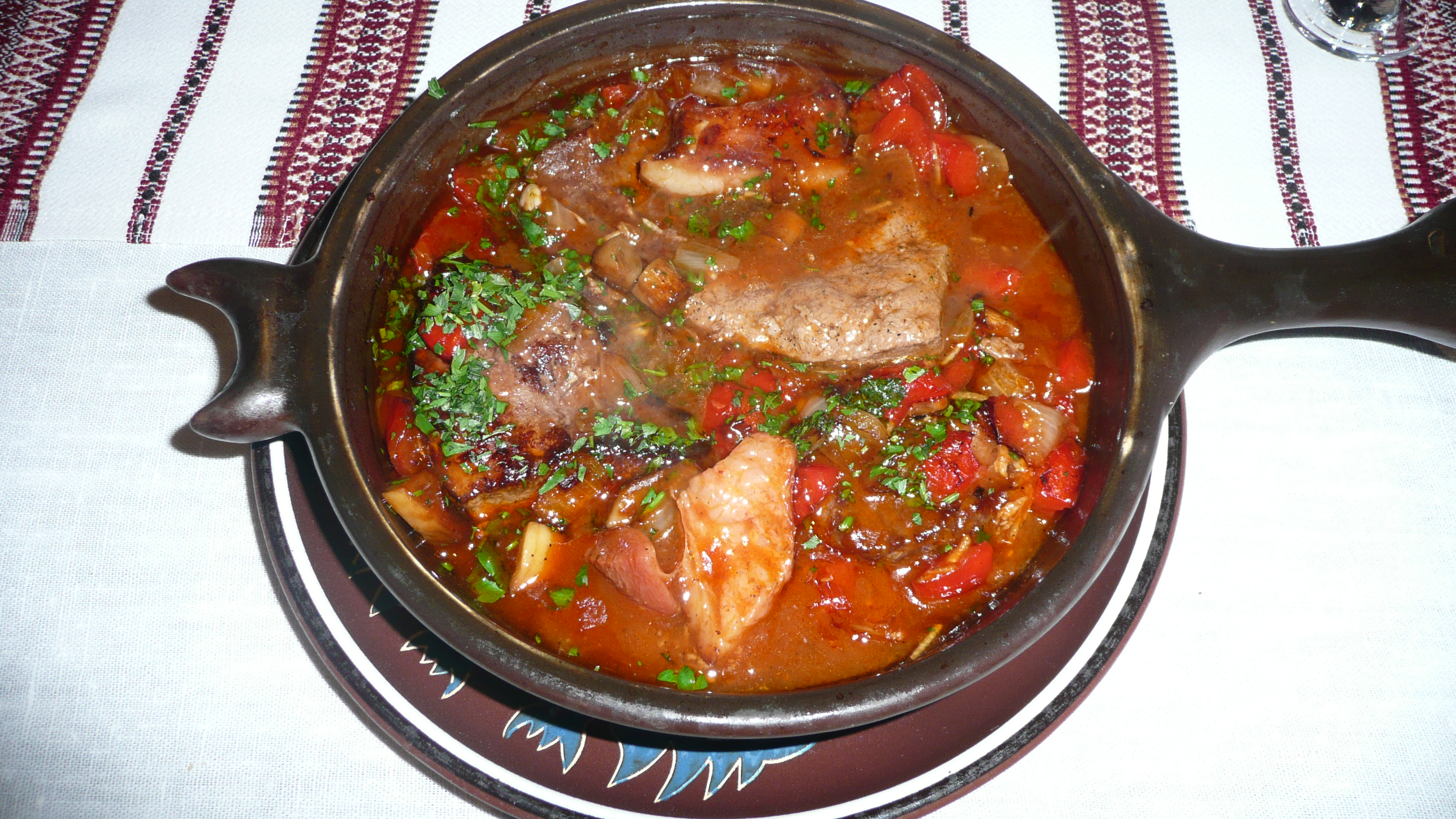
Pechenia

- Banush or banosh: a cornmeal stew.
- Chicken Kyiv (kotleta po-kyivsky): Kyiv-style chicken cutlet filled with butter and fresh herbs.
- Deruny: potato pancakes, usually served with sour cream.
- Fish (ryba): fried in egg and flour; cooked in oven with mushrooms, cheese, and lemon; pudding "Baba-sharpanyna"; pickled, dried or smoked variety.
- Halushky: a traditional Ukrainian dish made of steam-boiled leavened dough; can serve as an ingredient of soups, or as a separate dish with various fillings; a recipe native to the city of Poltava is halushky served with chicken meat and sour cream.
- Holubtsi: cabbage leaves, or sometimes vine leaves (fresh or preserved) rolled with rice or millet filling that may contain meat (minced beef or bacon), baked in oil and caramelized onions and may contain as a baking sauce tomato soup, cream or sour cream, bacon drippings or roasted with bacon strips on top.
- Huliash: refers to stew in general, or specifically Zakarpattian variety of Hungarian goulash.
- Kasha: porridge, usually made out of buckwheat, wheat, barley, rye, millet, rice, oat, or corn. One specific variety is kasha hrechana zi shkvarkamy (buckwheat cereal with fried pork rinds and onion).
- Kartoplianyky: fried balls of potato mash with flour and eggs; may have a filling.
- Kotlety or sichenyky (cutlets, meatballs): minced meat or fish mixed with onions, raw eggs, breadcrumbs or bread, and sometimes garlic and milk, fried in oil and sometimes rolled in breadcrumbs.
- Kruchenyky or zavyvantsi: pork or beef rolls with various stuffing: mushrooms, onions, eggs, cheese, prunes, sauerkraut, carrots, etc.
- Mlyntsi: thin pancakes, similar to French crêpes, Russian bliny, or Ashkenazi Jewish blintz. Stuffed mlyntsi are called nalysnyky, and they are usually filled with quark, meat, cabbage, or fruits, and served with sour cream.
- Potato (kartoplia, also dialectally barabolia, bulba, krumplia, mandeburka): young or peeled, served with butter, sour cream, dill; a more exclusive variety includes raw egg. May be boiled, fried, baked, or mashed.
- Pyrizhky: baked buns stuffed with different fillings, such as ground meat, liver, eggs, rice, onions, fried cabbage or sauerkraut, quark, cherries etc.
- Pyrih: a big pie with various fillings.
- Roast meat (pechenia): pork, veal, beef or lamb roast.
- Smazhenyna: fried meat.
- Stuffed duck or goose with apples.
- Varenyky: dumplings made with fillings such as mashed potatoes and fried onions, boiled ground meat and fried onions, liver and fried onions, fried cabbage with fried onions, quark, cherries, and strawberries. Served with sour cream and butter or sugar, when filled with fruits.
- Beef Borscht is a hearty soup made with beef, beets, onions, cabbage, carrot and other vegetables.
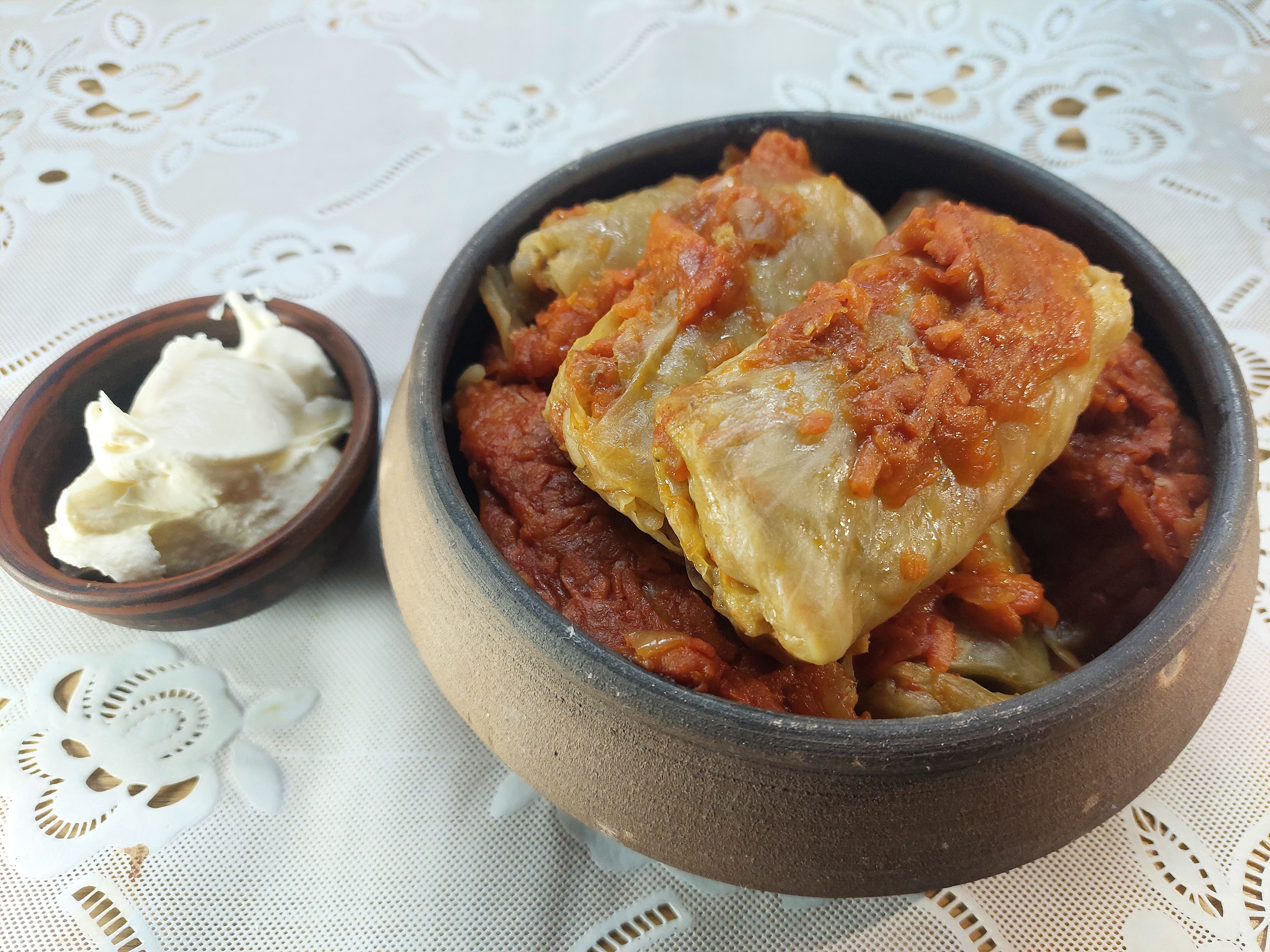
Holubtsi with smetana

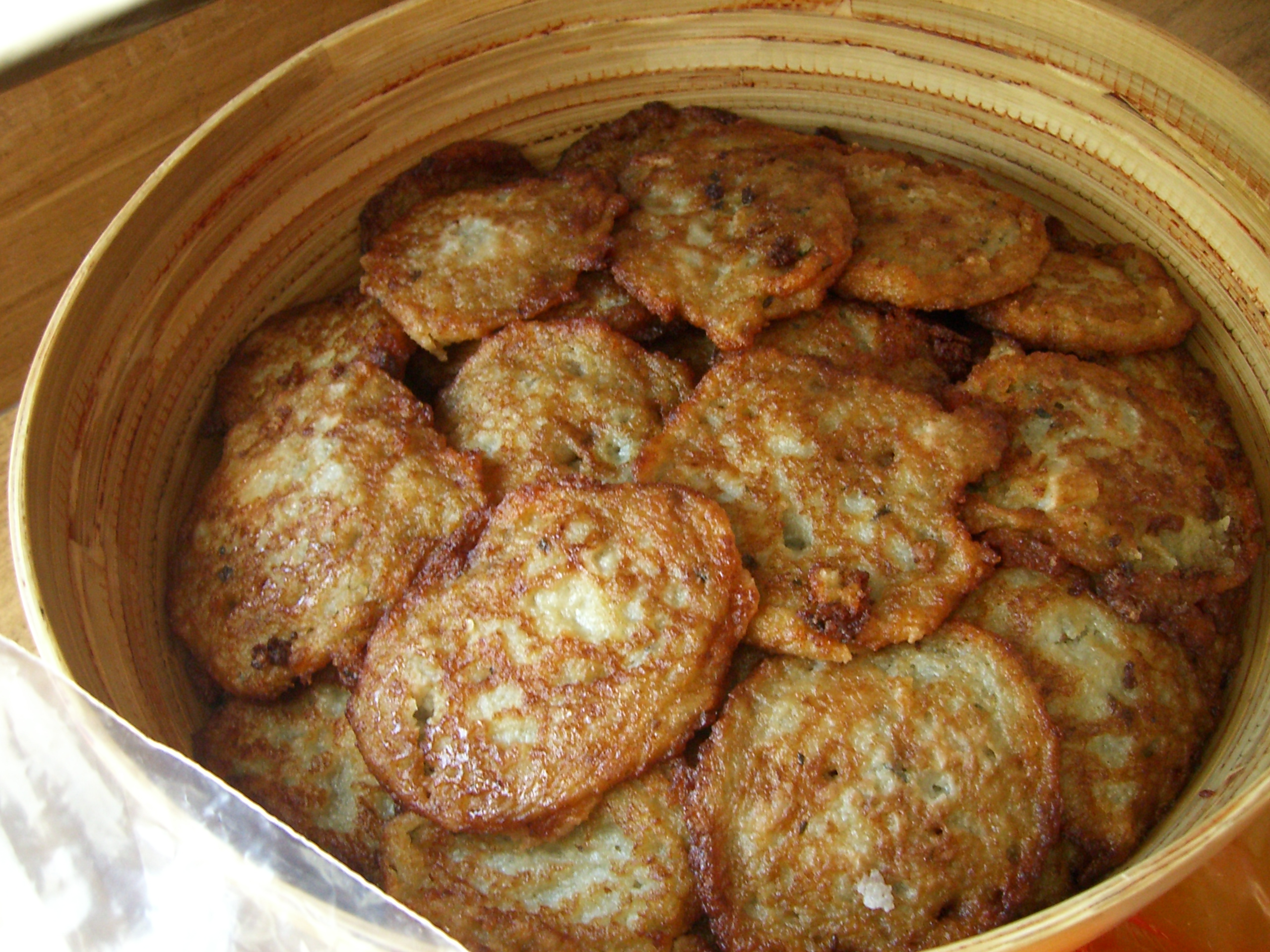
Deruny in a traditional crockery dish

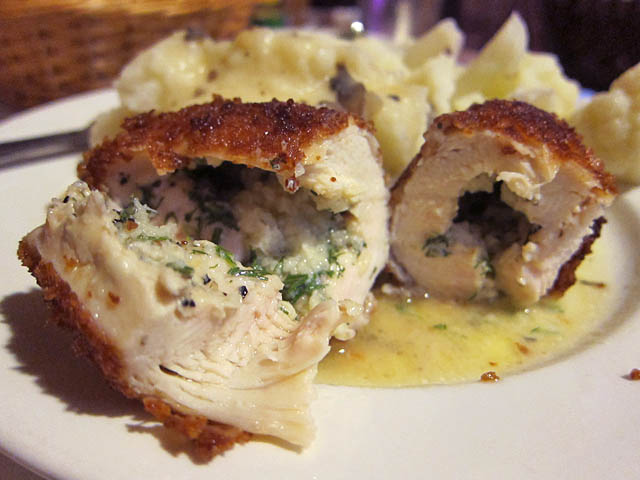
Kotleta po-kyivsky (Kyiv-style chicken)

== Desserts ==
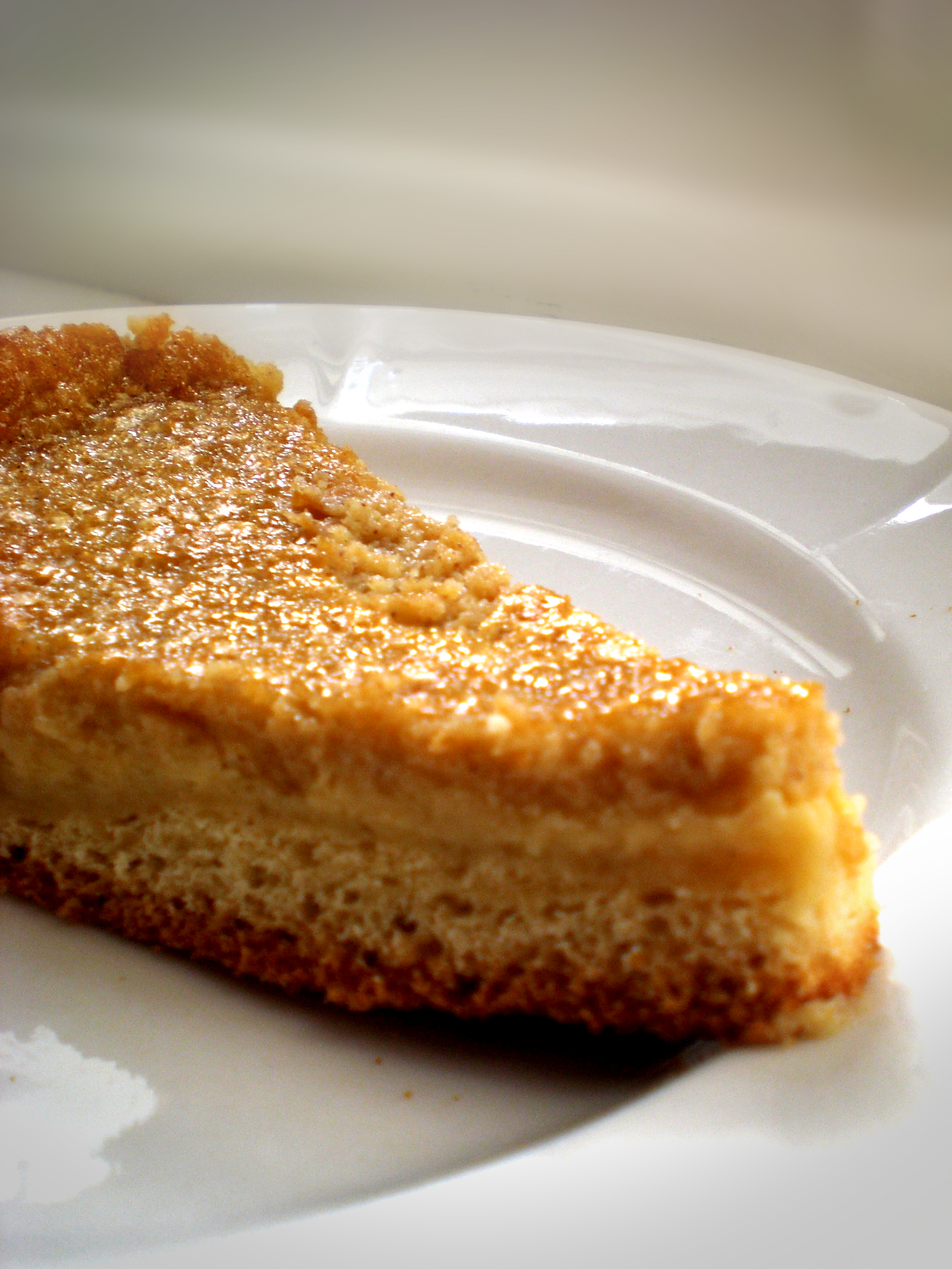
Smetannyk, a traditional Ukrainian dessert

- Kutia: traditional Christmas dish, made of poppy seeds, wheat, nuts, honey, and delicacies.
- Kyiv cake: creamy dessert consisting of two layers of meringue with hazelnuts and a buttercream filling.
- Mandryky: traditional pastry with cottage cheese.
- Medivnyk or medovyk: honey cake.
- Molozyvo: dish made by baking a beestings and egg mixture.
- Sweet pampushky: sweet dough similar to doughnut holes. Frequently tossed with sugar. Traditionally filled with rose preserve, but can also be filled with poppy seed or other sweet fillings.
- Pinnyk: berry mousse.
- Ptashyne moloko (literally: bird's milk): milk soufflé with chocolate coating.
- Shulyky: pieces of flatbread seasoned with honey and poppy seeds.
- Smetannyk: soft cake made with sour cream.
- Syrnyky: fried quark fritters, sometimes with raisins, served with sour cream, jam (varennia), honey or apple sauce.
- Tort: many varieties of layered cakes, from moist to puffy, most typical ones being Kyivskyi, Prazhskyi, and Trufelnyi. They are frequently made without flour, instead using ground walnuts or almonds.
- Varennia: a whole fruit preserve made by cooking berries and other fruits in sugar syrup.
- Vatrushka: pastry with sweet quark filling.
- Verhuny: crispy deep-fried pastry, similar to angel wings.
- Zhele (plural and singular): jellied fruits, like cherries, pears, etc.
- Zefir: soft dessert made from fruit or berry puree, sugar and egg whites. Similar to meringue.
- Yabchanka ― a chilled apple dessert.
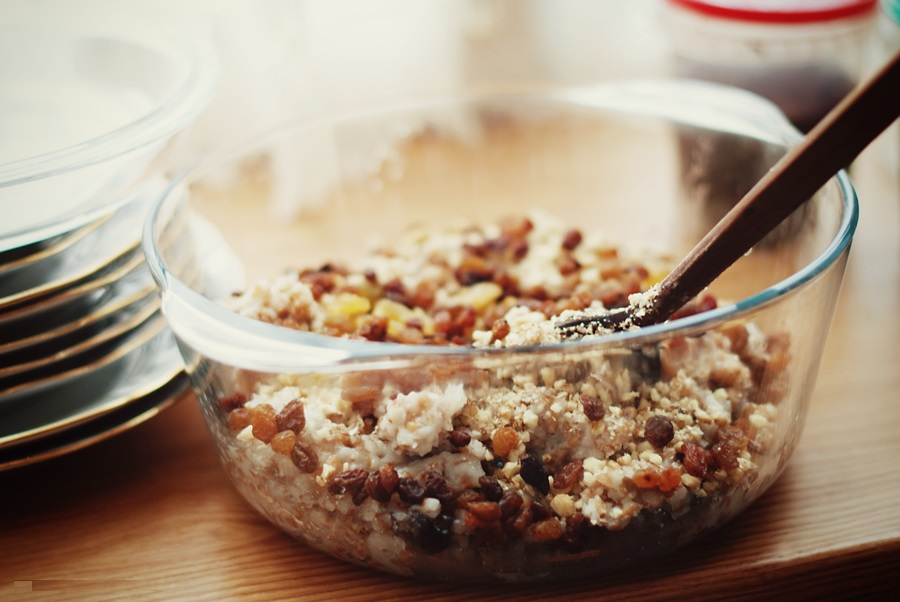
Kutia

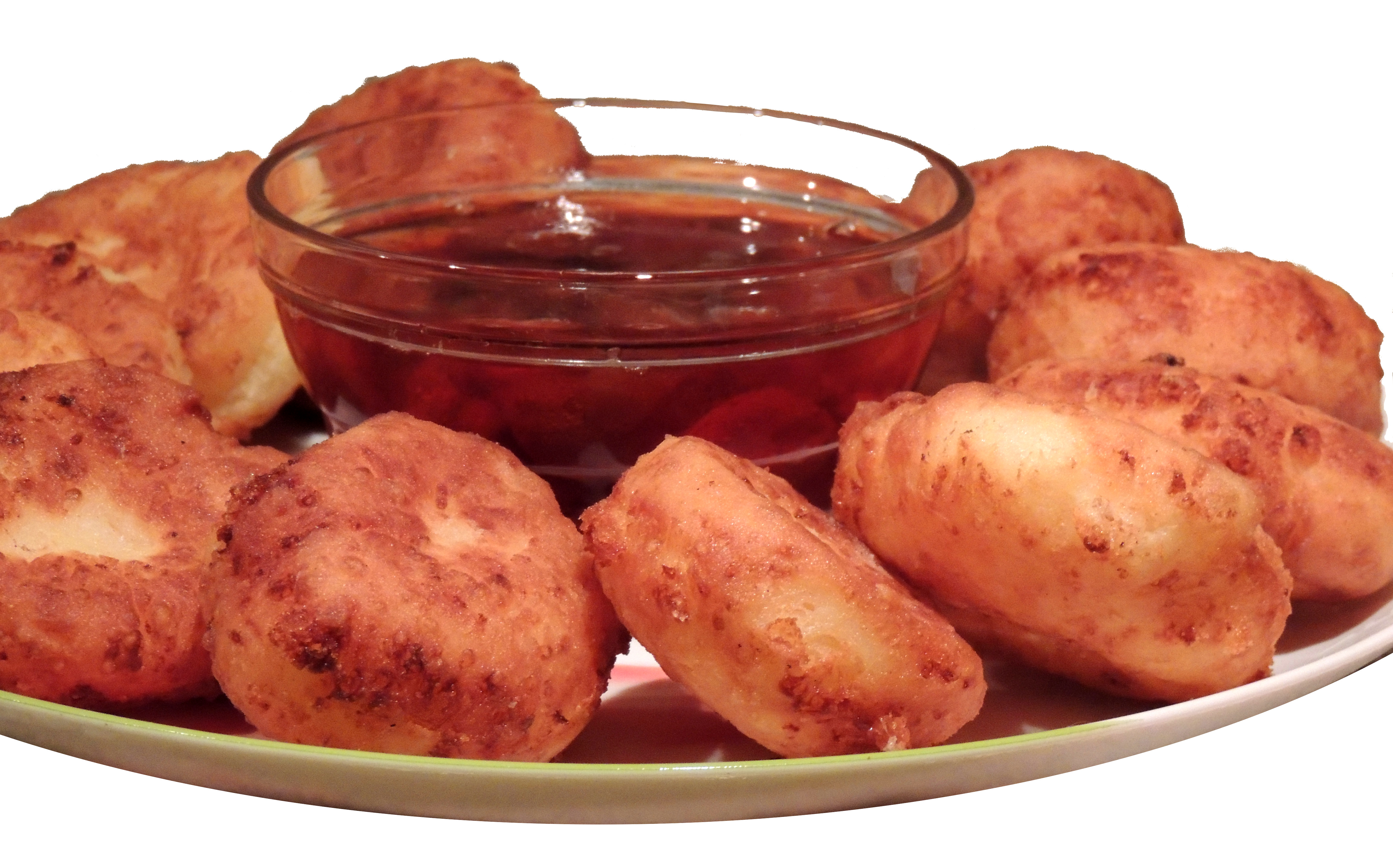
Syrnyky with raisins

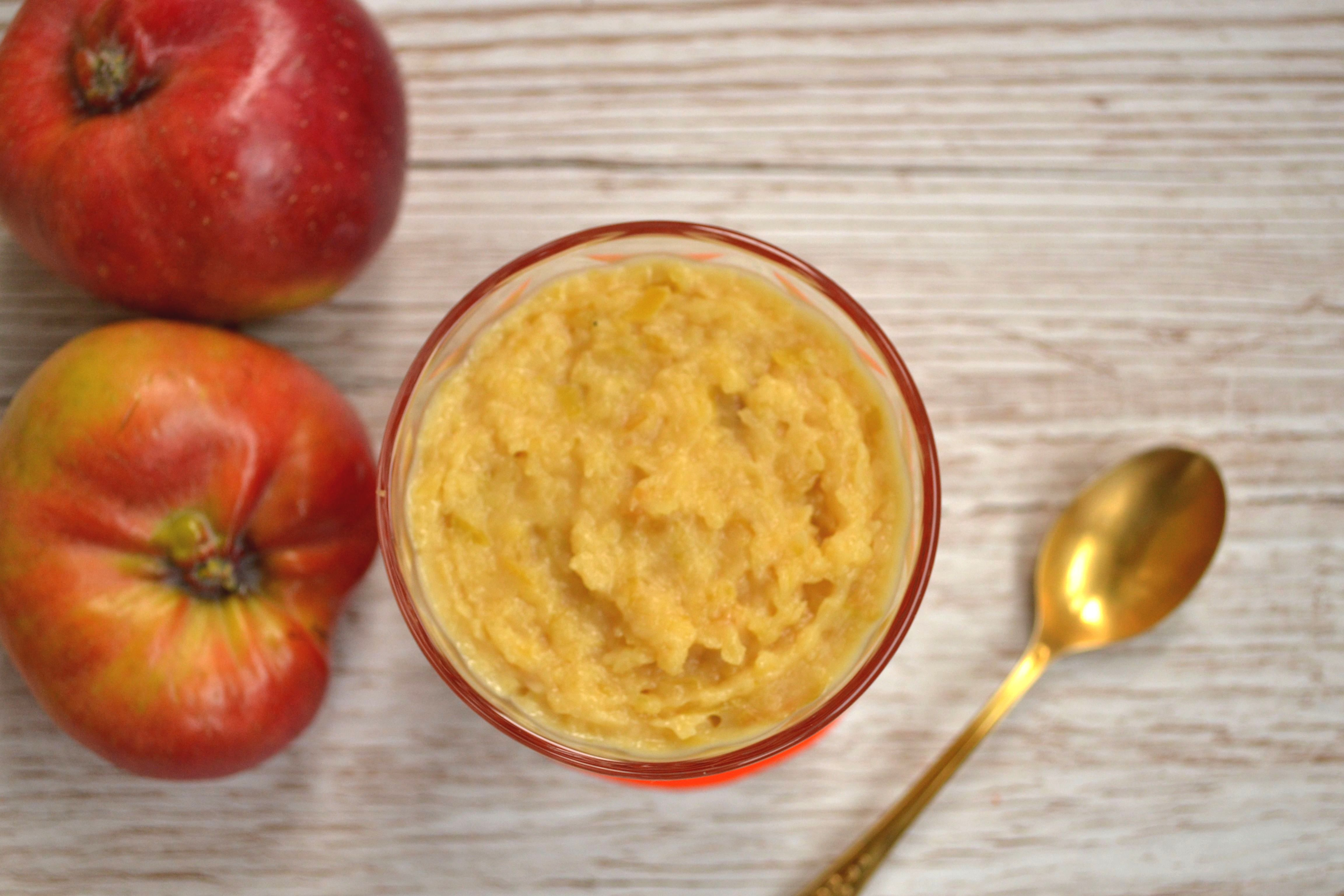
Yabchanka

== Beverages ==
=== Alcoholic ===
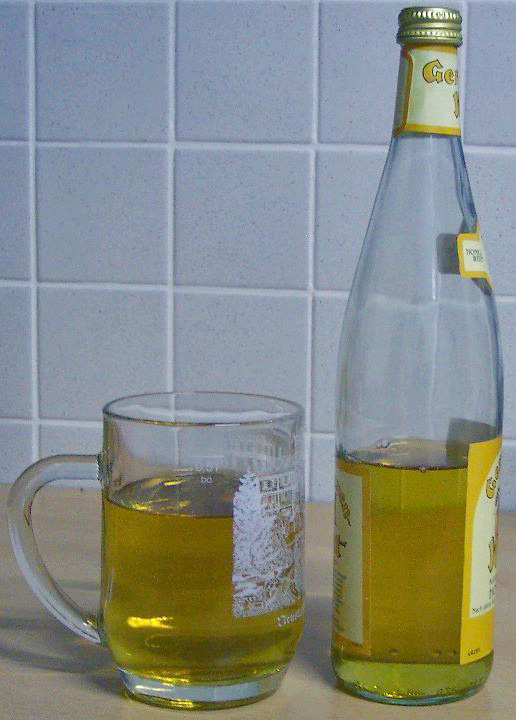
Mead

- Horilka: strong spirit of industrial production or its home-made equivalent – samohon (moonshine) is also popular, including with infusions of fruit, spices, herbs or hot peppers. One of the most exotic is flavoured with honey and red pepper.
- Beer (pyvo): the largest producers of beer are Obolon, Lvivske, Chernihivske, Slavutych, Sarmat, and Rogan, which partly export their products.
- Wine (vyno): from Europe and Ukraine (particularly from Crimea), mostly sweet. See Ukrainian wine.
- Mead (med or medukha): a fermented alcoholic beverage made from honey, water, and yeast. Its flavour depends on the plants frequented by the honeybees, the length of time and method of aging, and the specific strain of yeast used. Its alcohol content will vary from maker to maker depending on the method of production.
- Nalyvka: a homemade wine made from cherries, raspberries, gooseberries, bilberries, blackberries, plums, blackthorns or other berries or fruits. Berries were put into a sulija (a big glass bottle), some sugar was added. After the berries fermented, the liquid was separated from the berries, and put into corked bottles. The berries were used to make pyrizhky (baked or fried pastry). The wine has about 15% of alcohol.

=== Non-alcoholic ===
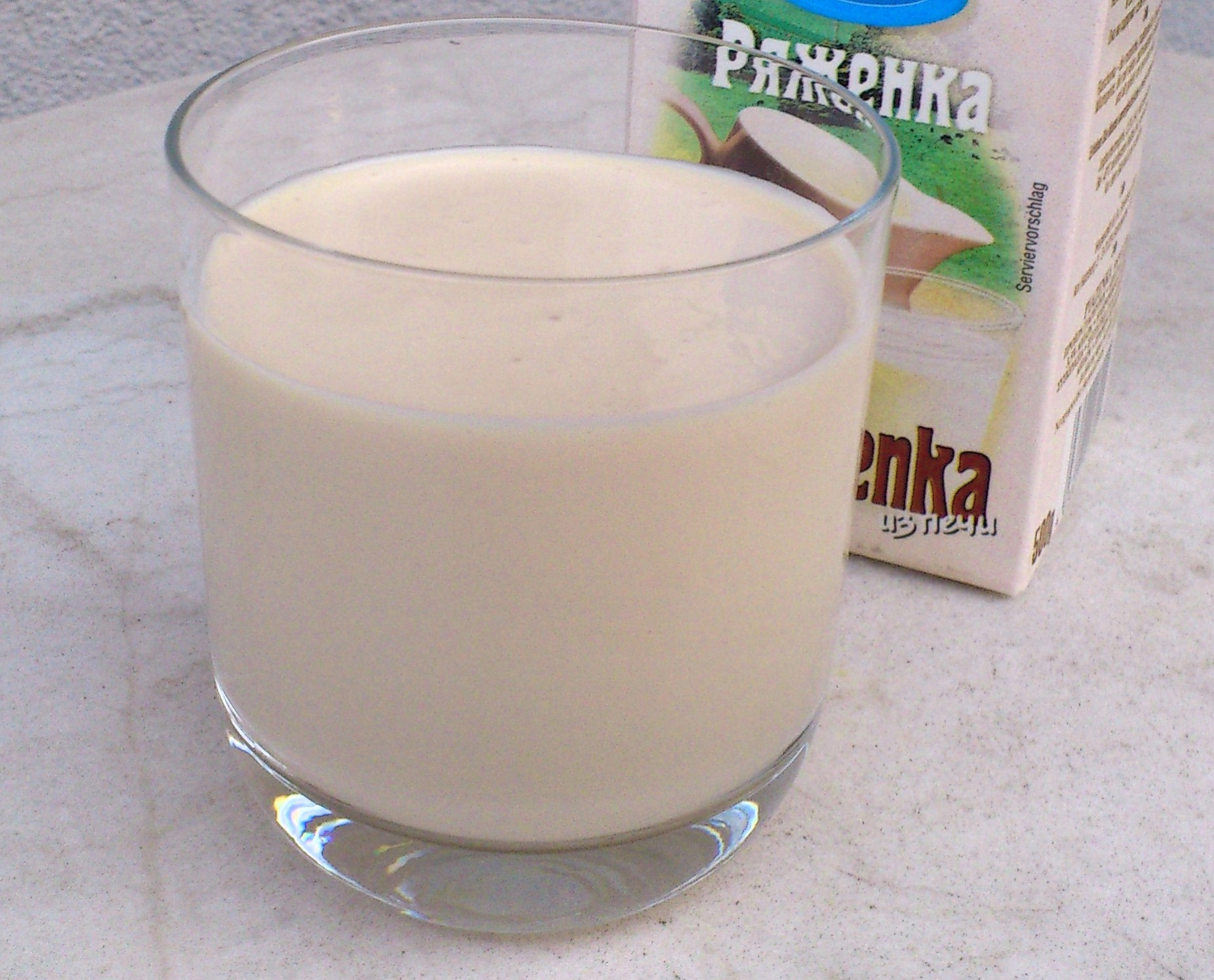
Ryazhanka

- Mineral water: well-known brands are Truskavetska, Morshynska, and Myrhorodska. They usually come strongly carbonated.
- Kompot: a sweet beverage made of dried or fresh fruits or berries boiled in water.
- Uzvar: a specific type of kompot made of dried fruit, usually apples, pears, and/or prunes. Traditionally served on Christmas.
- Kysil: a kompot that is thickened with potato starch.
- Kvas: a sweet-and-sour sparkling beverage brewed from yeast, sugar, and dried rye bread.
- Kefir: milk fermented by both yeast and lactobacillus bacteria, that has a similar taste to yogurt. Homemade kefir may contain a slight amount of alcohol.
- Pryazhene moloko: baked milk, a milk product that has a creamy colour and a light caramel flavour. It is made by simmering milk on low heat for at least eight hours.
- Ryazhanka: fermented baked milk.
- Syta: water with honey.

== Regional cuisines ==
=== Western Ukraine ===
==== Galician cuisine ====
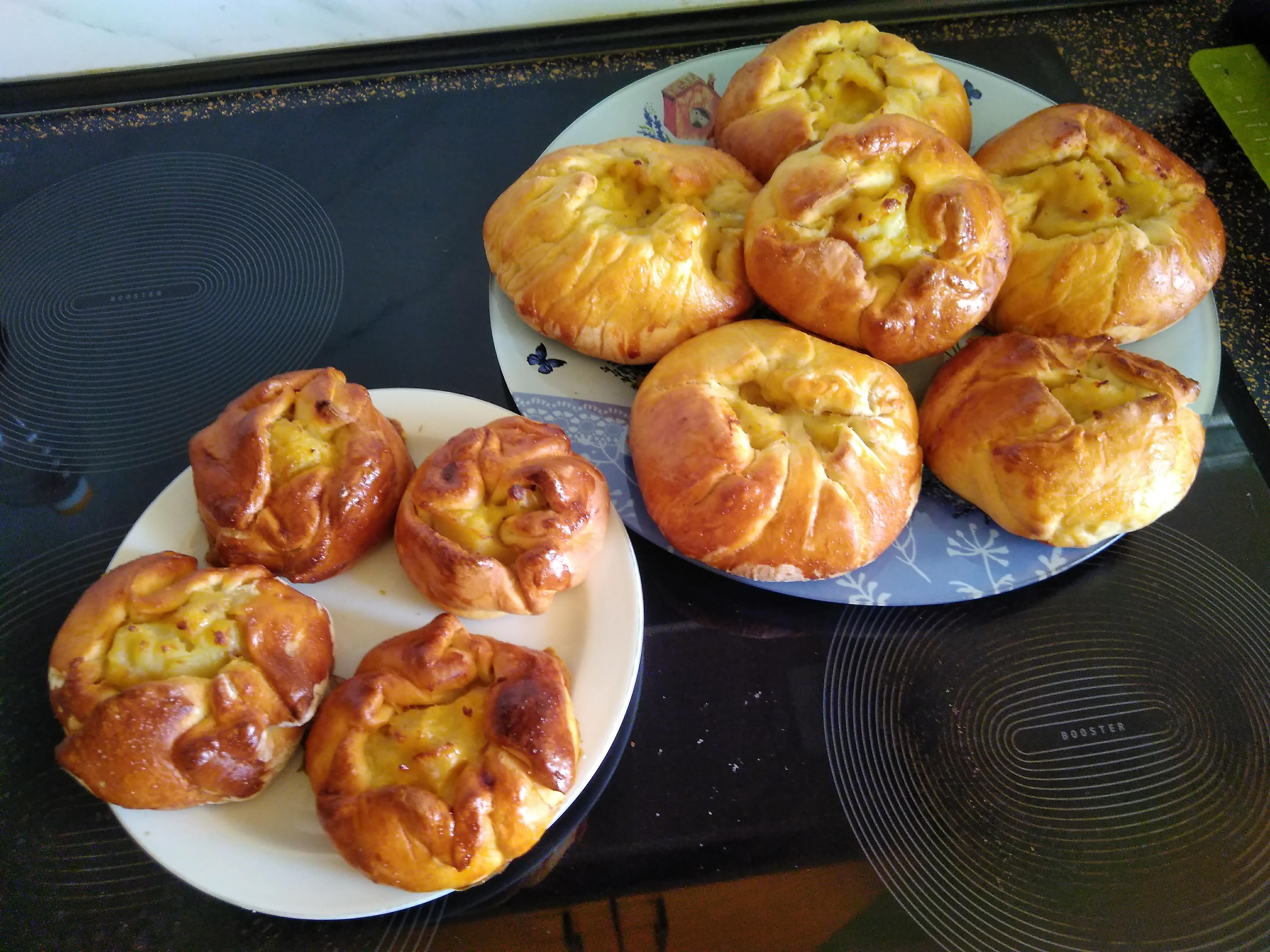
Knishes with potato

Culinary experts recognize the existence of a distinct Galician cuisine, which has its roots in the territory between the Carpathian Mountains in the west and Ternopil region in the east. Galician cuisine formed on the base of numerous subethnic groups inhabiting the region, such as Hutsuls, Boykos and Lemkos. Yuriy Vynnychuk considers rural and urban Galician cuisines to be separate phenomena. Taras Voznyak classifies Galician cuisine as part of a broader Central European cuisine. A distinct feature of Galician culinary traditions is the presence of significant Austrian, Italian and Hungarian influences as a result of the territory spending part of its history under Austrian rule. Galician cuisine also influenced the traditions of Polish cuisine. An important source on the history of Galician cuisine is Practical Kitchen by Olha Franko.

Among typical Galician dishes are zhur, knishes, machanka (a thick meat soup of Lemko origin), cabbage, white borshch, banosh, Yavoriv pie, holubtsi, spelt bread, knedle and maslianka. A popular dish of Ternopil Oblast is millet kulesha with cracklings. Popular desserts of Galicia include strudel and cheesecake. An original recipe from Ivano-Frankivsk Oblast are hombovtsi - filled dumplings similar to pierogi leniwe or baozi.

==== Lviv cuisine ====
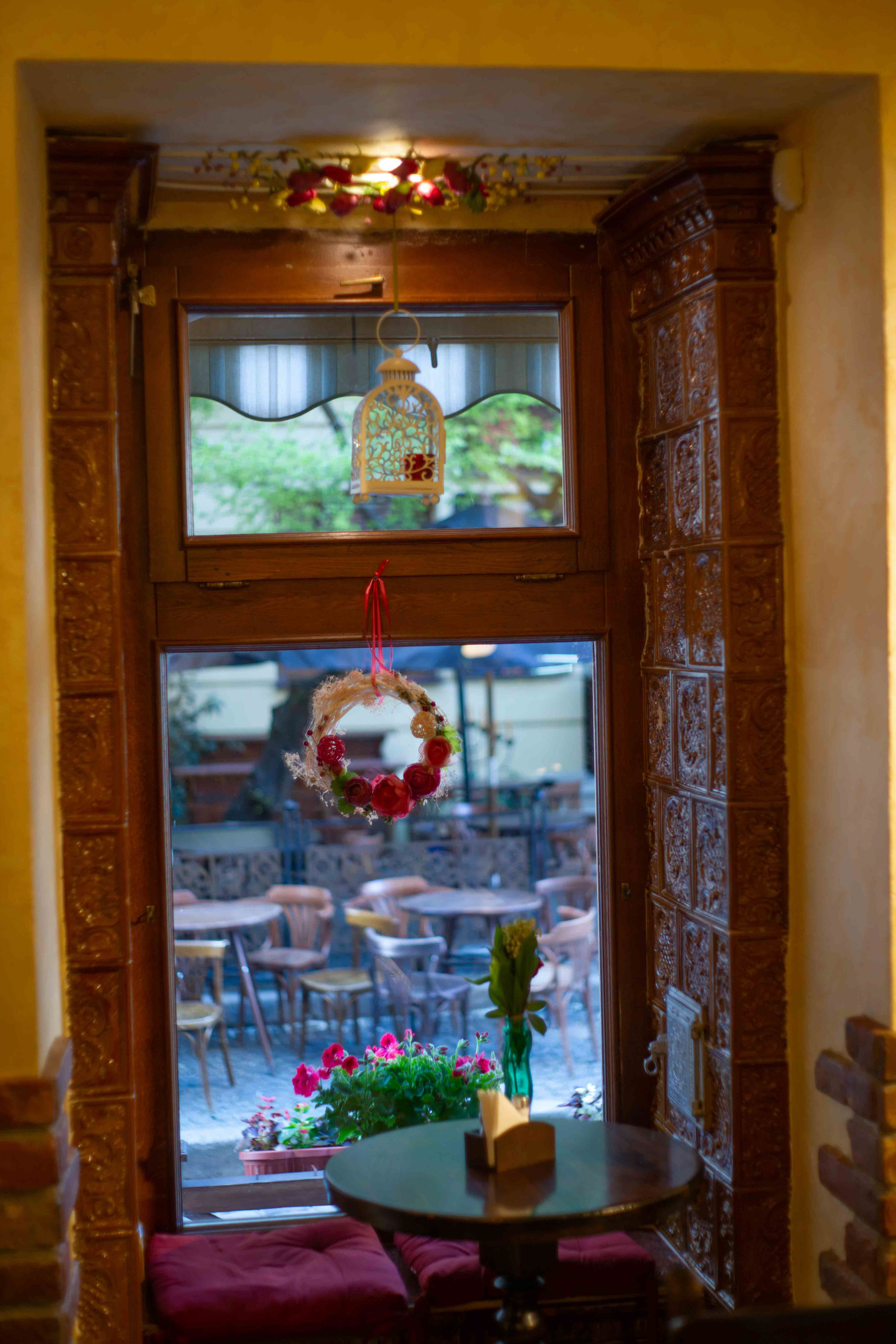
Interior of a Lviv coffeehouse

The city of Lviv developed its own culinary tradition, which influenced the cuisines of both Poland and Ukraine. Among its signature dishes are pierogi with potatoes, cheese and onions; veal broth with beans and noodles; chicken broth with farina; kluski made of farina, eggs and greens; yabchanka with cloves; various fruit and berry soups; nut cake. Typical breakfast foods consumed in Lviv are milk coffee, bread and butter, cottage cheese with sour cream. An important part in the diet of Leopolitans has traditionally been played by buckwheat kasha and maize porridge (mamaliga). Among meat dishes historically widespread in Lviv are pork schnitzel, zrazy, roast beef and fried chicken. A traditional Lviv dessert is legumina (dish), washed down with kompot. During the summer period, Leopolitans would also consume many vegetables. A traditional variety of Lviv kutia is prepared with boiled wheat grains, raisins, poppy seed, honey and lemon juice. Historically, Lviv has also been an important centre of beer and wine production.

Lviv's culinary traditions were seriously damaged during the Soviet period, as the new regime declared the city's restaurant and coffeehouse culture to be "bourgeois". Traditional establishments were replaced with canteens, which oriented themselves on workers and peasants, specializing on serving alcohol and juices and offering primitive low-quality food as a supplement. The pre-war tradition of wine consumption was replaced through the introduction of vodka, sweet fortified wines and brandy. Only during the 1970s did quality wines and liqueurs become accessible. This period also saw the reemergence of coffeehouses and establishment of grill bars. Nevertheless, food in cafes and restaurants during Soviet times remained of a lower quality than homemade dishes.

==== Carpathian cuisines ====
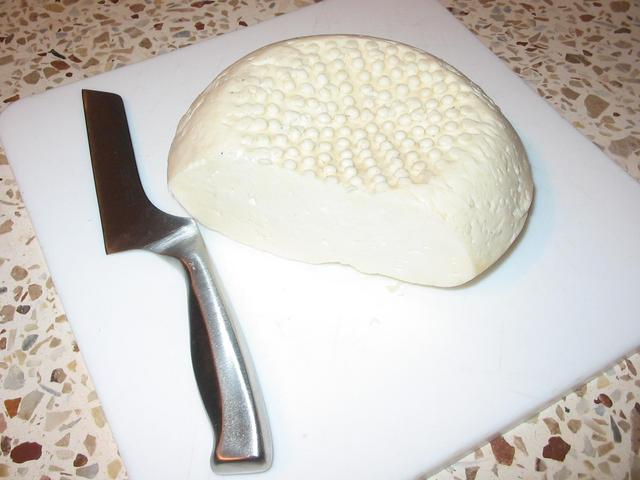
A head of Carpathian bryndza

Traditional dishes of the Boykos include knishes, oshchypky (unleavened bread), mushroom soup, battered peas, machanka and "black pies".

The most important ingredients of Hutsul cuisine are maize, potatoes, beans, mushrooms and bryndza. Traditional Hutsul dishes include banosh (maize flour porridge), huslianka (sour milk), vurda (sheep milk cheese), budz, pancakes and shupenia (a dish made from beans).

A traditional Transcarpathian dish stemming from Hungarian cuisine is bogrács - gulyas meat cooked on an open fire with addition of paprika and various herbs. Another typical speciality of Transcarpathia is zavyvantsi - beef rolls with eggs, pickled cucumber, fatback and potatoes. Some other dishes typical of the region are shovdar - smoked ham and lekvar - plum jam.

A popular speciality in Bukovyna and the broader Carpathian region of Ukraine is mushroom soup with sour cream. Among other traditional dishes in the area are chynakhy (smothered or baked ribs with potatoes, beans and onions), brynza, mamaliga and platsyndy.

==== Podolian and Volhynian cuisines ====
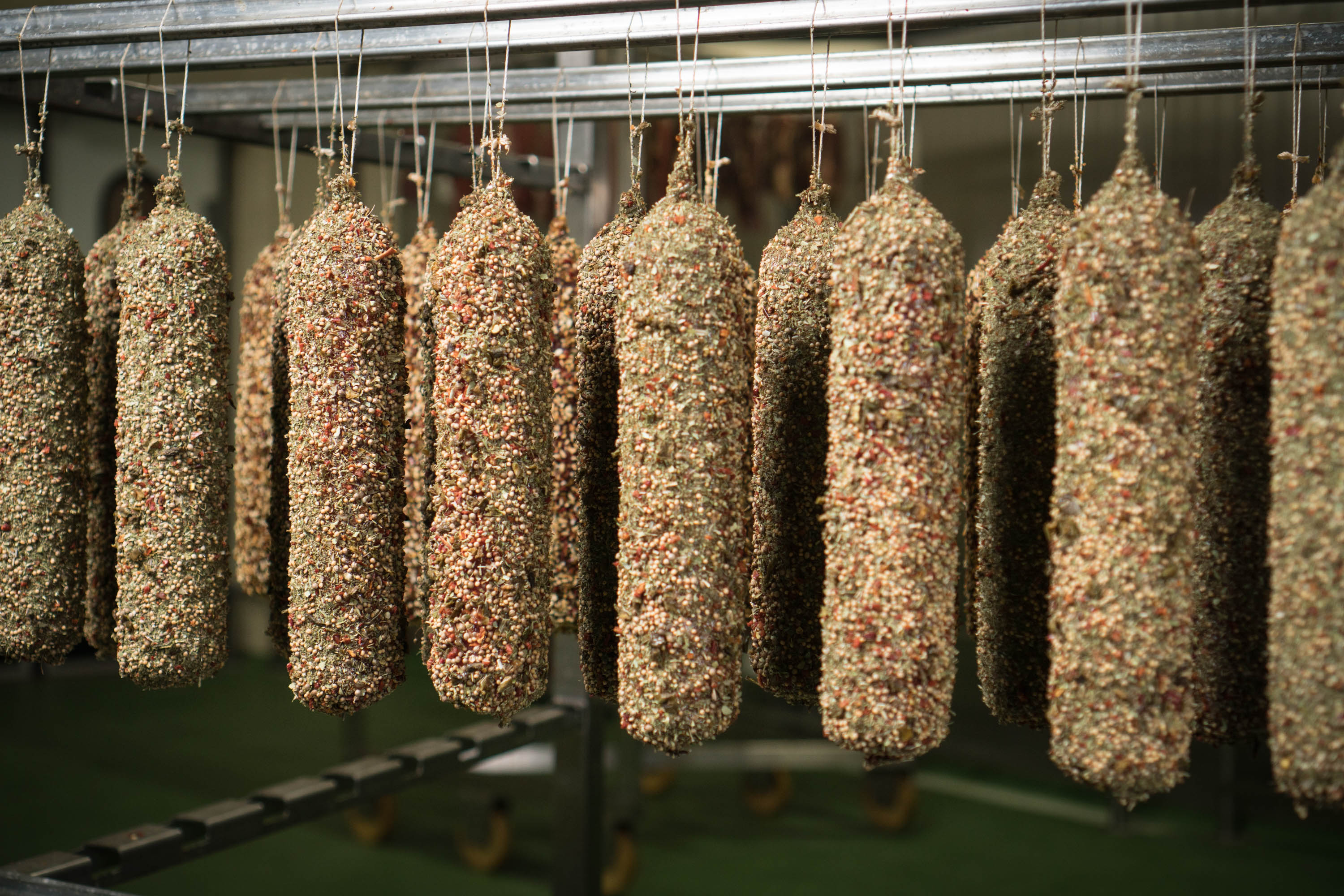
Ukrainian sausages

Vinnytsia Oblast in the historical region of Podolia is known for the popularity of dishes from Polish cuisine, such as bigos and flaki, which are also widespread in nearby Galicia. In Khmelnytsky Oblast various sausages are popular, including vederey - pork intestine filled with potato. A traditional speciality of the village of Ulaniv are potatoes fried in oil with onion, garlic and other spices.

The region of Volhynia is known for dishes such as mazuryky - turkey sausages filled with butter and cheese. Other popular local dishes are verhuny and zrazy.

=== Northern Ukraine ===
==== Polesia ====
The region of Polesia (Polissia) covers the northern parts of Ukraine's Volyn, Rivne, Zhytomyr, Kyiv and Chernihiv regions. Its forested and marshy areas contributed to the preservation of archaic culinary practices. An important part in Polesian cuisine is played by products of fishing and gathering, such as berries, mushrooms and grasses.

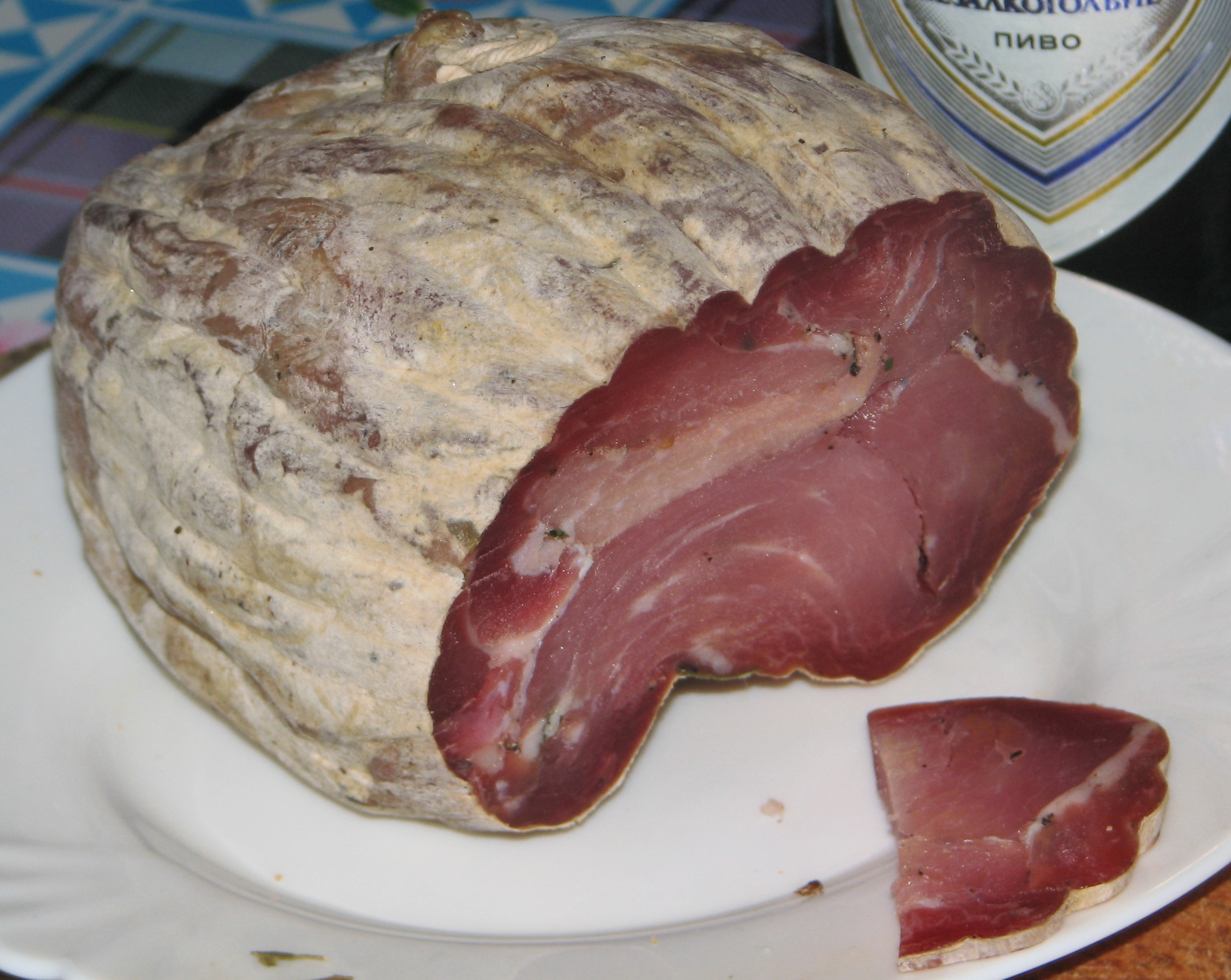
Matsyk

The most widespread type of flour in the region is made of rye. Typical Polesian pastries include pies, soft pancakes and various breads, some of which play a role in religious rituals. A traditional local dish is buckwheat varenyky made from rye with addition of sour milk. Another archaic local dish is kvasha, cooked from sour dough. Traditional Polesian festive specialities include borshch, kysil, pancakes with sour cream, cottage cheese with milk, as well as kvasovka - millet porridge with dried fruit.

Many common dishes in Polesia are known under local names, for example tomachi (mashed potatoes), kalamukha (boiled cherries with sour cream and flour), hartanachka (millet porridge with meat and potatoes), bukhty (white flour pastries with raisins and berries), krupnyk (soup with millet, mushrooms and whey). Some other typical specialities of the region are kalatusha - mushroom soup served with flatbreads of pancakes; holubtsi with potatoes and mushrooms; potato babka (makar).

A speciality unique for Rivne and Volyn regions is matsyk, also known as karukh, kirukh, matsiok, kniushok or bohuk. It is prepared from freshly slaughtered meat dried and ripened ripened inside of a canvas bag, pig stomach or bladder.

The Polesian village of Smidyn in Kovel Raion is famous for its baked cabbage, which has been included into the List of Intangible Cultural Heritage elements in Ukraine.

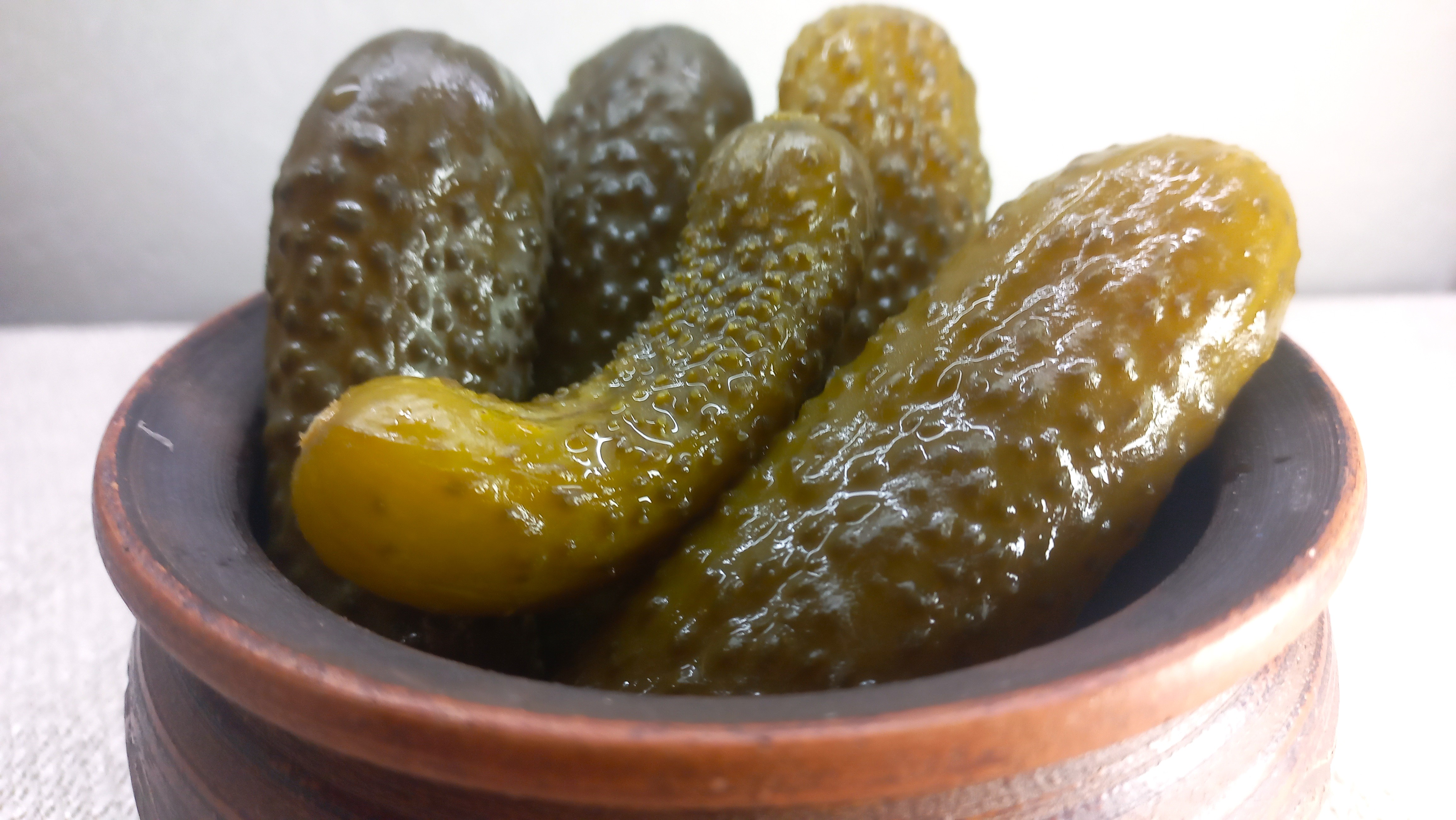
Fermented cucumbers from Chernihiv region

A traditional dish of the territory of Kholmshchyna is volk or voylok, cooked from young leaves of beet, goosefoot or nettle.

A widespread product of Polesian cuisine are blueberries, traditionally consumed with milk, bread and sour cream. Dried blueberries can also be used as an ingredient of other dishes.

In Chernihiv Polesia a popular traditional dish are fried or smothered cucumbers with carrots, onions and meat, known as hurky. Other local dishes of Northern Ukraine include pechenia (pot-baked potatoes, sauerkraut and meat, sometimes with addition of sour cream, paprika, cheese, beans or mushrooms), and pies with guelder-rose filling.

A signature dish of Polesia is deruny - potato pancakes. An international deruny festival takes place every year in the city of Korosten. Another popular Polesian dish is verhuny - crispy oil-fried dough pastries.

==== Kyiv ====
A well-known recipe stemming from Kyiv is chicken Kiev, made of battered chicken fillet with a piece of butter, cheese and greens put inside. A traditional variety of borshch cooked in Kyiv includes beef and prunes among its ingredients.

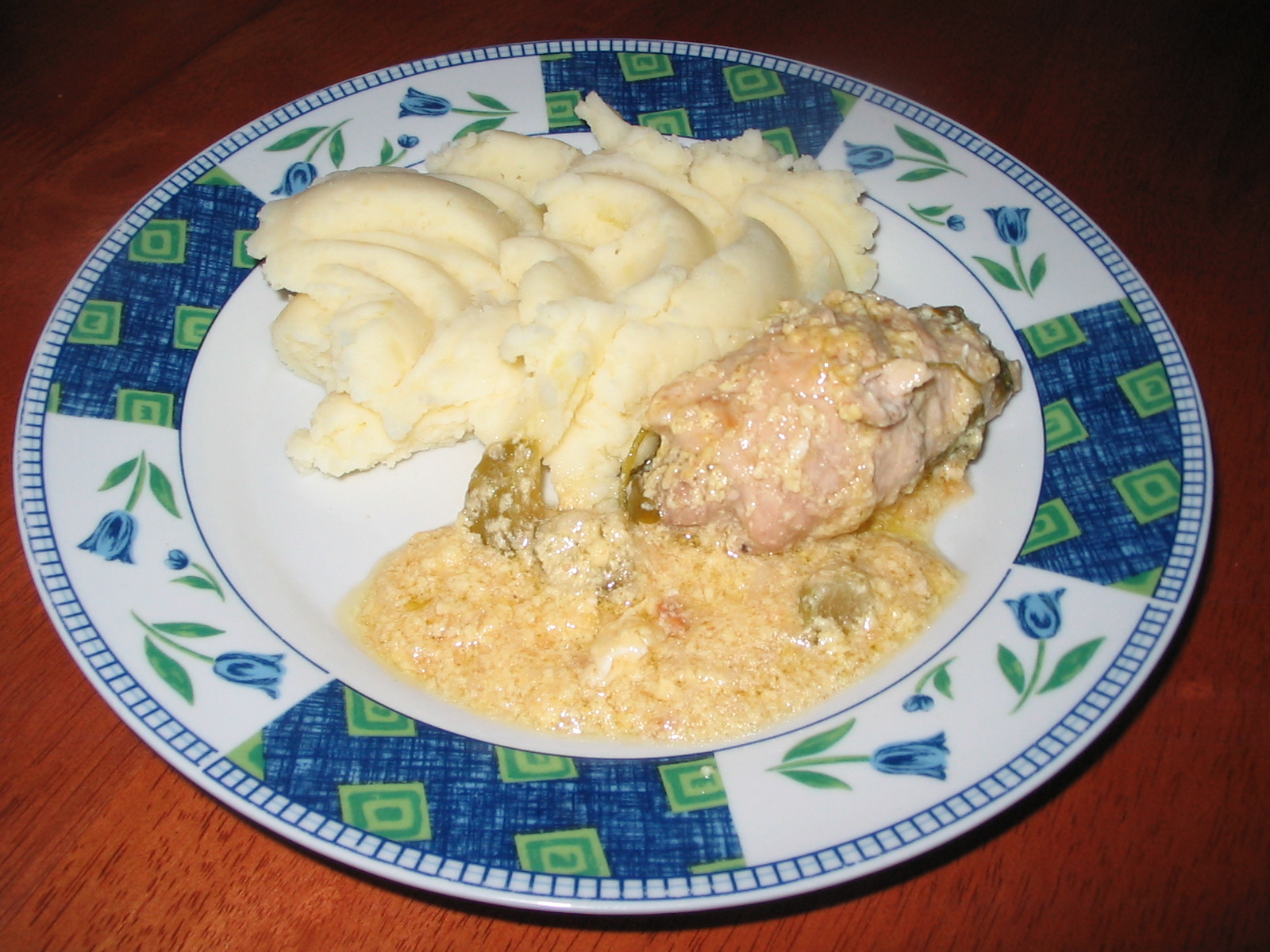
Kruchenyky served with potatoes and mushroom sauce

=== Central Ukraine ===
A signature dish of Cherkasy Oblast is borshch and pampushky with garlic. Other popular local specialities are varenyky and kruchenyky - meat rolls with a filling of minced meat, pâté, prunes and nuts. In Poltava Oblast a special type of halushky with various fillings is widespread. Another popular dish in the region is pundyky - sweet or savoury dough flatbreads fried on a pan.

In the 19th century Poltava and the surrounding areas became centres of culinary innovations, such as introduction of rice, potato and turkey meat. It also became one of the first regions in Ukraine to produce sunflower oil. Local gardens in Opishnia and Mhar used to produce prune plums used as an ingredient of various dishes and beverages along with apples and pears. Popular traditional drinks in the region are birch sap, fruit kvas and uzvar. Notable alcoholic beverages of Poltava region are various fruit nalyvkas, herbal and spice tinctures, as well as varenukha - a drink made from horilka, dried fruit and honey.

Until the early 20th century, Poltava Governorate exported various baked goods and watermelons to Kyiv and other locations. A traditional speciality of Poltava region is kalynnyk - a variety of bread baked with addition of guelder rose berries. Other dishes forming part of the region's culinary heritage are pyrizhky, shcherba, kapusniak, tovchenyky, lokshyna with meat, salo, kholodets and zatirka.

A popular dish of Dnieper Ukraine is fish soup (ukha) with a seasoning of salt and garlic.

=== Southern Ukraine ===
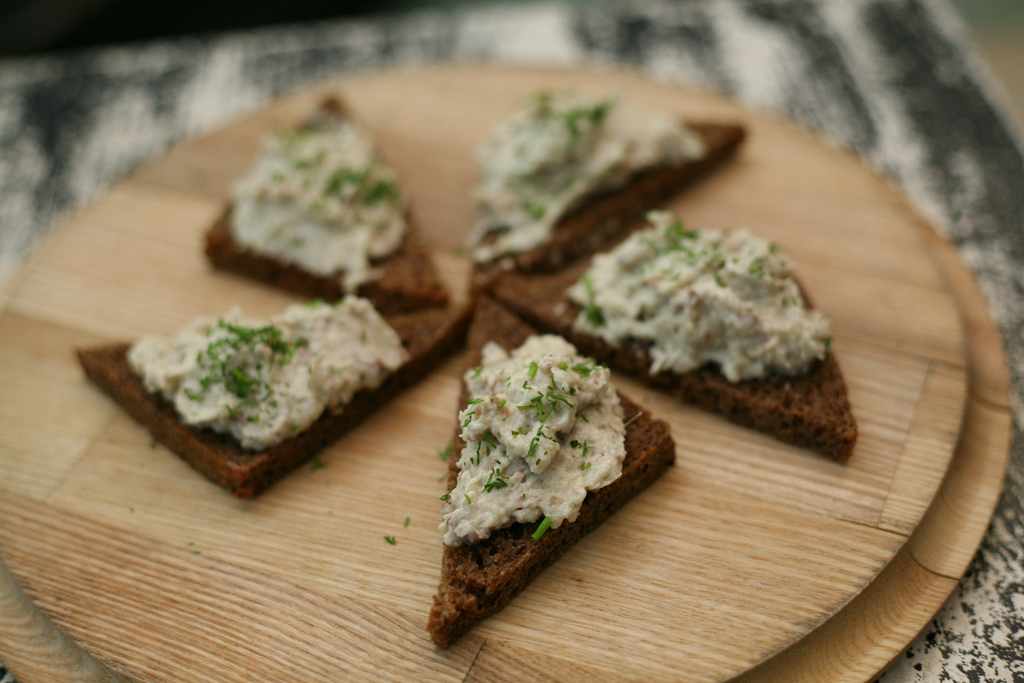
Odesa-style forshmak

The cuisine of Southern Ukraine is known for its abundance of seafood. The port city of Odesa is known for its unique culinary tradition. A typical dish widespread in Odesa are gobies, which can be dried or fried in a mix with dough. The latter recipe can also include other fish, such as clupeonella. Another famous local speciality is gefilte fish. In the nearby Mykolaiv region a popular dish is ukha with tomato juice, sour cream and garlic. Common specialities in Kherson are aubergines fried in oil with addition of paprika and apple vinegar, as well as aubergine "caviar" (ikra). A common dish of Jewish cuisine popular in cities of southern-central Ukraine such as Odesa and Dnipro is forshmak - chopped herring served with boiled potatoes, onions and eggs.

Common local dishes of Zaporizhzhia Oblast are kapusniak with pork and thin pancakes with cheese and butter.

Historical populations of Crimea such as Crimean Tatars and Greeks also have their own cuisines. Among the most famous Crimean Tatar dishes are laghman, dolma and chebureks.

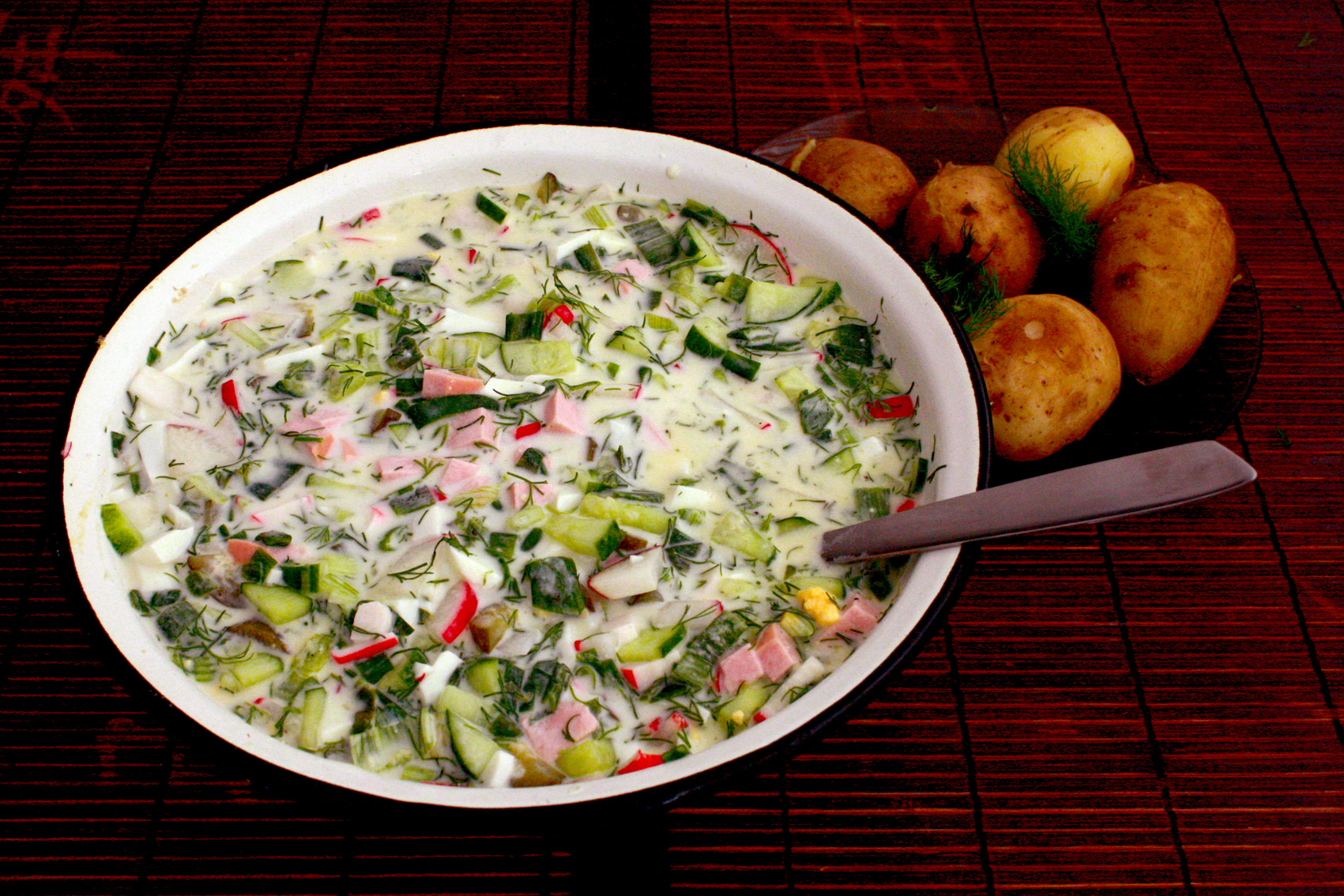
Okroshka with ayran

=== Eastern Ukraine ===
In Sloboda Ukraine borshch is traditionally cooked with the addition of beans and meat frikadellen. A popular second dish is hrechanyky - meatballs with buckwheat.

Common dishes of the Donbas region include baked ham hock and various types of okroshka - a cold soup on the base of kvass, whey or even mineral water, seasoned with sour cream. A signature speciality of Luhansk is a roll made of minced pork and beef, omelette and carrots.

== See also ==
- Culinary arts
- Mushroom picking in Slavic culture
- Twelve-dish Christmas Eve supper
