= List of Intangible Cultural Heritage elements in Ukraine =

Location of Ukraine within Europe

The United Nations Educational, Scientific and Cultural Organization (UNESCO) defines intangible cultural heritage elements as non-physical traditions and practices performed by a people. As part of a country's cultural heritage, they include celebrations, festivals, performances, oral traditions, music, and the making of handicrafts. The term intangible cultural heritage is formally established by the Convention for the Safeguarding of the Intangible Cultural Heritage, which was drafted in 2003 and took effect in 2006. The inscription of new heritage elements on UNESCO's Intangible Cultural Heritage Lists for protection and safeguarding is determined by the Intergovernmental Committee for the Safeguarding of Intangible Cultural Heritage, an organization established by the Convention. Ukraine ratified the Convention on 27 May 2008.

Since 2012, the Ministry of Culture of Ukraine (Note: On 3 September 2019, the Honcharuk Government merged the ministries of Culture, Information Policy, and Youth and Sports, forming the Ministry of Culture, Youth, and Sports. On 23 March 2020, with the restoration of the Ministry of Youth and Sports, the Shmyhal Government established the Ministry of Culture and Information Policy. On 6 September 2024, it was renamed to the Ministry of Culture and Strategic Communications. On 31 October 2025, the Svyrydenko Government once again renamed it to the Ministry of Culture.) has also maintained the National Register of Elements of the Intangible Cultural Heritage of Ukraine to safeguard the country's cultural elements, which is required by the Convention for the further nomination of elements to the UNESCO lists. In turn, to enter the National Register, elements must play a significant role in the social life of a community and have concrete measures of protection for a period of one to five years. Submissions of elements are reviewed by the Expert Council on Intangible Cultural Heritage, an advisory body that controls the inscription of elements on the Register.

As of September 2026, seven items from Ukraine are inscribed on the UNESCO Intangible Cultural Heritage of Humanity Lists. The first Ukrainian element listed – Petrykivka decorative painting – was inscribed in 2013. The egg painting tradition of pysanka is a transnational element shared with Estonia. Six items were nominated for inclusion on the UNESCO lists in the future. (Note: Christmas Eve celebration in Lithuania, Poland and Ukraine and Transhumance, the seasonal droving of livestock – both transnational elements – were nominated for 2026, while Agyr ava ve Kaytarma – a traditional dance of the Crimean Tatars, the embroidery technique 'white-in-white' of the town Reshetylivka in Poltava region, the Rivne region tradition of the Polissia Dudka-Vykrutka, and the Safeguarding practice of the "Tradition of the Generous Evening in Ukraine" through formal and non-formal education are pending without a specified nomination date.) In addition, 129 items are inscribed on Ukraine's National Register. (Note: Hundreds more elements are inscribed on local and regional registers of intangible cultural heritage corresponding to hromadas (municipalities) and oblasts (regions) of Ukraine, respectively. The regional registers are regulated by regional centers of folk art, while local registers may be created by the local governments' departments of culture. Although it is common for elements to first enter a regional register before being inscribed on the national one, this is not required by national law. Strictly local and regional elements of intangible cultural heritage are not included in this list.) Although all regions of Ukraine are represented in the National Register through elements such as borscht and holubtsi, it does not yet include entries specific to Kherson Oblast and the city of Sevastopol.

== Intangible Cultural Heritage of Humanity ==
UNESCO's Intangible Cultural Heritage of Humanity consists of three lists.

+ Transnational element

=== Representative List ===
This list aims to represent the intangible cultural heritage of Ukraine worldwide and bring awareness to its significance.

Intangible Cultural Heritage elements recognized by UNESCO
Name	Media	Year	No.	Description (Note: Words directly transliterated from Ukrainian or other languages are shown in italics, excluding placenames and people's names. For the romanization of Ukrainian, the national system is preferred, and words in their plural form are not translated (e.g., pysanky, not pysankas).)
Petrykivka decorative painting as a phenomenon of the Ukrainian ornamental folk art	A painted box	2013	00893	It is a traditional Ukrainian decorative painting style, originating from the rural settlement of Petrykivka in Dnipropetrovsk Oblast, where it was traditionally used to decorate house walls and everyday household items. Common ornaments include branches and wildflowers, including those of nonexistent plants. The style is achieved, in part, through the use of vivid paints applied with special paintbrushes made with cat hair or plants.
Tradition of Kosiv painted ceramics	A selection of painted ceramic objects	2019	01456	The distinctive painted ceramics from Kosiv and nearby villages originated in the 1700s and were popularized in the 1840s–1870s. The ceramic products are made with white clay and then painted in green, yellow, and brown. They reflect the history and culture of the Hutsul people, depicting scenes from life, animals, and ornaments.
Örnek, a Crimean Tatar ornament and knowledge about it	Tree of life ornament on a paper	2021	01601	This Crimean Tatar design of ornamentation originates from the Crimean Khanate that existed in 15th–18th centuries and was traditionally passed down in craft workshops. Örnek is used in embroidery, weaving, pottery, engraving, jewellery, and wood carving, as well as glass and wall painting. It features floral and geometric motifs. The listing also includes knowledge and understanding of the practice.
Pysanka, Ukrainian tradition and art of decorating eggs + (Note: Shared with Estonia)	Painted eggs	2024	02134	To create pysanky, eggs are partially covered in wax using a pysachok (stylus) and dipped in dye to produce colorful patterns and ornaments that may carry symbolic meaning. Even though it was almost completely erased in the Soviet Union, the tradition of making pysanky has become popular again throughout Ukraine following independence. Nowadays, the tradition is associated with Easter and can also be found in the Ukrainian diaspora, especially in Estonia, resulting in the shared nomination of the item from both Ukraine and Estonia.

=== Need of Urgent Safeguarding ===
This list covers elements that are endangered and thus require appropriate safeguarding.

Endangered elements recognized by UNESCO
Name	Media	Year	No.	Description
Cossack's songs of Dnipropetrovsk Region		2016	01194	These works, originating from Zaporozhian Cossack communities in Dnipropetrovsk Oblast, talk about the tragedy of war and the personal experiences of soldiers. The lyrics maintain spiritual ties with the past and are also entertaining. The songs are slow, long, repetitive, and typically do not involve any musical instruments. Although they were traditionally performed by men, nowadays Cossack songs are mostly preserved by women's and mixed groups. This element is in need of safeguarding as the continuity of the element is in danger of being disrupted due to the aging of the singers and a lack of interest among the youth.
Culture of Ukrainian borscht cooking	A bowl of red borscht with two pieces of bread, sour cream, and garlic	2022	01852	This beetroot soup has its place as a distinct culinary practice in Ukraine, despite its variance throughout different regions. The recipe of borscht is passed down within families and the dish is associated with numerous regional ritual practices. Borscht has become an intrinsic part of the country's culture, which is reflected in Ukrainian literature, folklore, festivals, and placenames. The element is in need of safeguarding due to the displacement of people and disruption of agriculture caused by the Russian invasion of Ukraine.

=== Register of Good Safeguarding Practices ===
This list accredits programs and projects that safeguard intangible cultural heritage and express the principles of the Convention.

Good Safeguarding Practices recognized by UNESCO
Name	Media	Year	No.	Description
Safeguarding programme of kobza and wheel lyre tradition	Modern lirnyk and kobzar	2024	02136	Players of kobza and wheel lyre, known as kobzari and lirnyky, were visually impaired travelling musicians that formed guilds. Their repertoire included historic and religious songs, as well as dumy (epic poems). Their musical tradition called kobzarstvo emerged in the 16th century and continued until the early 19th century. Despite the persecution of the kobzari in the early period of the Soviet Union, the tradition has survived with the re-establishment of kobzar guilds in the 1980s and the popularization of the tradition in the modern era.

== National Register ==
The National Register of Elements of the Intangible Cultural Heritage consists of five inventories.

↑ Element later inscribed in the UNESCO Lists

=== Inventory of Intangible Cultural Heritage ===
Elements recognized by the Ukrainian government
Name (Note: The English translations used here are unofficial, as the National Register is only available in Ukrainian. Official Ukrainian names are shown below the translations, with links to the relevant Ukrainian Wikipedia articles if applicable.)	Media	Date inscribed	No.	Description
Tradition of Kosiv painted ceramics ↑ Традиція Косівської мальованої кераміки	Painted ceramic vessels	14 December 2012	001	The distinctive painted ceramics from Kosiv and nearby villages originated in the 1700s and were popularized in the 1840s–1870s. The ceramic products are made with white clay and then painted in green, yellow, and brown. They reflect the history and culture of the Hutsul people, depicting scenes from life, animals, and ornaments.
Krolevets handloom weaving Кролевецьке переборне ткацтво	A handloom with embroided towels in the background	14 December 2012	002	The towels and carpets from Krolevets originated in the second half of the 18th century and were popularized in the end of the 19th and beginning of the 20th centuries with the establishment of the Khrestovozdvyzhenskyi Fair in the city. Their red embroidery forms geometric ornaments that have become a part of the local culture. Krolevets towels hold a special role in local wedding ceremonies. These towels have a geographical indication in Ukraine, meaning that some stages of their production process are guaranteed to take place in their area of origin, which determines certain qualities of the product.
Opishnia ceramics Опішнянська кераміка	A selection of painted ceramics for sale	14 December 2012	003	Opishnia in Poltava Oblast has been a pottery center since the 15th century, producing a variety of ceramic objects, such as pots, bowls, makitry, smoking pipes, candlesticks, kumantsi (torus-shaped decorative jugs), and figurines. Since the beginning of the 20th century, various ornaments have been painted on the ceramics, usually involving only two or three colors.
Petrykivka painting – a Ukrainian decorative ornamental art of 19th–21st centuries ↑ Петриківський розпис – українське декоративно-орнаментальне малярство ХІХ – ХХІ ст.	A painted plate	14 December 2012	004	It is a traditional Ukrainian decorative painting style, originating from the rural settlement of Petrykivka in Dnipropetrovsk Oblast, where it was traditionally used to decorate house walls and everyday household items. Common ornaments include branches and wildflowers, including those of nonexistent plants. The style is achieved, in part, through the use of vivid paints applied with special paintbrushes made with cat hair or plants. Petrykivka painting has a geographical indication in Ukraine, meaning that some stages of its production process are guaranteed to take place in its area of origin, which determines certain qualities of the product.
Cossack's songs of Dnipropetrovsk Oblast ↑ Козацькі пісні Дніпропетровщини	A postcard with an image of Cossacks and notes and lyrics of a song	21 January 2015	005	These works, originating from Zaporozhian Cossack communities in the region, talk about the tragedy of war and the personal experiences of soldiers. The lyrics maintain spiritual ties with the past and are also entertaining. The songs are slow, long, repetitive, and typically do not involve any musical instruments. Although they were traditionally performed by men, nowadays Cossack songs are mostly preserved by women's and mixed groups.
Singing tradition of the village of Luka, Kyiv-Sviatoshyn Raion, Kyiv Oblast (Note: The name of this element is currently outdated. As the result of the 2020 administrative reform in Ukraine, the Kyiv-Sviatoshyn Raion (district) where the village of Luka was located was merged into Bucha Raion.) Пісенна традиція села Лука Києво-Святошинського району Київської області		29 June 2017	006	The village of Luka in Kyiv Oblast has preserved the tradition of singing a variety of folk songs. While ritual songs (which are sung on specific holidays and ceremonies) have a heterophonic one- or two-part composition, longer songs (about love, day-to-day life, Chumaks, Cossacks, or history) are generally three-part. Luka-style singing combines features from both Polissia and Dnieper Ukraine. The tradition has mainly been preserved by the group Chervona Kalyna (pictured).
Technique of "white-in-white" embroidery of the rural settlement of Reshetylivka, Reshetylivka Raion, Poltava Oblast (Note: The name of this element is currently outdated. On 7 November 2017, Reshetylivka became a city. In addition, as the result of the 2020 administrative reform in Ukraine, the Reshetylivka Raion (district) where the city was located was merged into Poltava Raion.) Технологія виконання вишивки «білим по білому» селища Решетилівка Решетилівського району Полтавської області	A white sleeve with a white ornament	29 June 2017	007	This embroidery technique from Reshetylivka involves creating geometric and floral ornaments using a white thread on white fabric. Items with Reshetylivka embroidery include clothing (such as vyshyvanky), interior decoration items, and towels.
Tradition of floral carpet weaving of the rural settlement of Reshetylivka, Reshetylivka Raion, Poltava Oblast Традиції рослинного килимарства селища Решетилівка Решетилівського району Полтавської області	A carpet with a colorful floral ornament	12 February 2018	008	These carpets from Reshetylivka feature traditional peasants' ornaments, which are more expressive and have smoother edges compared to carpet ornaments from other parts of Ukraine. The different-colored threads are woven such that certain hues are only visible from up close, and combine into a single harmonious work from afar. Plants and animals are most commonly depicted on Reshetylivka carpets.
Tradition of ornamental painting of Bubnivka ceramics Традиція орнаментального розпису бубнівської кераміки	A collection of painted ceramics	30 May 2018	010	While the pottery tradition in Bubnivka in Vinnytsia Oblast has existed since the 17th century, the local ornamental painting developed in the 19th century. Pots, bowls, and figurines are covered in geometric and floral ornaments, primarily using dark green, brown, and white paints. Nowadays, this element is also found in the neighboring village of Novoselivka.
Tree beekeeping Бортництво	A tree beehive	30 May 2018	011	Tree beekeeping has been widespread in Ukraine since the Kievan Rus' period. Although it has mostly been replaced by modern methods of beekeeping in the 19th century, this tradition has partly survived in Polissia. This practice involves hollowing out pieces of tree trunks, placing them on trees so that wild bees form colonies inside, and collecting honey when it is ready. This element specifically covers Rivne and Zhytomyr oblasts.
Tradition of Hutsul pysanka ↑ (Note: Hutsul pysanka and Ukrainian pysanka are inscribed as one item in the UNESCO list.) Традиція гуцульської писанки	Painted eggs	16 November 2018	012	This specific type of pysanky (eggs painted using a wax-resist method) originates from the mountainous Hutsul region. Their ornaments differ significantly throughout parts of the region, featuring various colors, styles, and themes. The village of Kosmach is a major center of Hutsul pysanky.
Tradition of the "Vodinnia Kusta" folk ritual in the village of Svarytsevychi, Dubrovytsia Raion, Rivne Oblast (Note: The name of this element is currently outdated. As the result of the 2020 administrative reform in Ukraine, the Dubrovytsia Raion (district) where the village of Svarytsevychi was located was merged into Sarny Raion.) Традиція обряду «Водіння Куста» у селі Сварицевичі Дубровицького району Рівненської області	A girl with leaves incorporated into her costume followed by women in traditional costumes	16 November 2018	014	Vodinnia Kusta (lit. 'Procession of the Bush') is a tradition that dates back to the Pagan period. As part of the ritual, a girl dresses up as Kust (lit. 'Bush') during summer solstice and represent the souls of the dead that are believed to appear on this day. Kust then walks around the village and receive gifts and blessings, which supposedly bring happiness and good luck to the gifters. Nowadays, the date of the ritual has shifted to Pentecost and survived in the most traditional form in the village of Svarytsevychi.
Tradition of the Samchyky village decorative painting Традиція декоративного розпису села Самчики	Two plates with colorful floral ornaments	4 July 2019	015	The tradition of painting in Samchyky in Khmelnytskyi Oblast appeared in the end of the 19th to the beginning of the 20th centuries. It almost disappeared after World War II, but regained popularity in the 1970s. It involves painting house walls and household objects in colorful, flat ornaments, primarily using floral motifs.
Artistic wood carving of Chernihiv Oblast Художнє дереворізьблення Чернігівщини	A green wooden house with elaborately carved elements	4 July 2019	017	Although wood carving has existed on the territory of Chernihiv Oblast since the 11th century, most carved objects that have survived to this day are from the 18th century onward. The carving tradition extends to furniture, tools, ceremonial objects, musical instruments, chests, toys, decorations, and architecture. The ornament varies in different parts of the region. The school of wood carving has leading centers in Chernihiv, Nizhyn, and Novhorod-Siverskyi.
Hutsul koliada and pliesy of Verkhovyna Raion, Ivano-Frankivsk Oblast Гуцульська коляда та плєси Верховинського району Івано-Франківської області	A group of men in traditional costumes exiting a church and singing	28 December 2019	018	As part of this tradition from Verkhovyna Raion, groups of men receive blessings in a church before caroling. Some of the carolers sing koliadky (Christmas songs), while others play music. A crucial part of Hutsul koliada is pliesy – ritual dances that are performed before and after the song. Each carol may take hours to complete. This celebration extends from Christmas to Epiphany, meaning that the carolers do not return home for around two weeks.
Custom of performing the dances of Arkan and Kovalivka in Pechenizhyn hromada Звичай виконувати танець Аркан з Ковалівкою в Печеніжинській ОТГ	A group of men dancing in a circle	5 August 2020	019	Even though the Hutsul men's dance Arkan involves quick changes in movements and rhythm, the performers stay in a circle for its entire duration. The dance's circular nature is tied to Pagan symbolism of the Sun as a deity, with its function being to ward off evil. In Pechenizhyn settlement hromada, this dance also has a second part named Kovalivka, which is accompanied by singing and a different melody. Occasionally, it further transitions to Hutsulka, a dance performed in pairs of men and women.
Art of making the "Valky svyshchyk" musical clay toy Мистецтво виготовлення звукової глиняної забавки «Валківський свищик»	A man blowing into a small whistling toy shaped like a rooster	5 August 2020	020	The svyshchyk (ocarina-like whistle toy) has been an integral element of pottery in Valky since the craft's appearance in the region. The creation of these animal-shaped toys is a complex process, as they are meticulously created to produce a high-quality sound. They are sold as souvenirs, and were historically used in place of change in markets.
Technology of making "wax" vinok in Vinnytsia Oblast Технологія виготовлення «воскових» вінків на Вінниччині	A head wreath decorated with wax droplets	5 August 2020	021	This type of vinok (Ukrainian head wreath) is made by attaching droplets of wax to a metal wire or thread. Although beeswax was used in the past, now it has largely been replaced with paraffin wax. The wax vinok appeared in the end of the 19th century as an imitation of wreaths from Western Europe made with expensive white materials such as orange blossoms or pearls, and has since become a key part of the bride's outfit in the region.
Culture of Ukrainian borscht cooking ↑ Культура приготування українського борщу	A bowl of borscht with bread and salt on the side in a village setting	13 October 2020	022	This beetroot soup has its place as a distinct culinary practice in Ukraine, despite its variance throughout different regions. The recipe of borscht is passed down within families and the dish is associated with numerous regional ritual practices. Borscht has become an intrinsic part of the country's culture, which is reflected in Ukrainian literature, folklore, festivals, and placenames.
Carpathian lizhnyk production Карпатське ліжникарство	Wool blankets with ornaments	13 October 2020	023	These thick wool blankets made by Hutsuls and Boykos may be monochrome or feature geometric ornaments. They originate from the 16th century. In addition to covering beds, benches, and seats, a lizhnyk may be hung above the bed for decorative purposes and act as an amulet. The center of lizhnyk production is the village of Yavoriv in Kosiv Raion, Ivano-Frankivsk Oblast.
Borshchiv folk embroidery Борщівська народна вишивка	A collection of embroided women's shirts	13 October 2020	024	Vyshyvanky from Borshchiv have a simple cut that contrasts with the dense, complex embroidery. Although black embroidery usually predominates, red, yellow, green, and blue threads are also used. The geometric ornaments used to carry symbolic meanings. Borshchiv shirts are worn on special occasions, including holidays, weddings, and funerals.
Technology of creating the Klembivka embroided shirt "with a flower" Технологія створення клембівської сорочки «з квіткою»	Fragment of an embroided shirt	13 October 2020	025	Embroided shirts from Klembivka, Vinnytsia Oblast, are distinguished by their flower-like geometric ornaments located on the neckline. The "flower" is composed of a combination of traditional Podolian symbols (e.g. crosses, swastikas, rhombi), which altogether convey a certain message. This ornament is usually black, red, yellow, or blue. The nyz sewing technique is applied, which involves embroiding from the back side of the cloth with a straight stitch, with the ornament ultimately forming on the front.
Easter folk festivity "Vodyty Volodara" in the village of Rozkoshivka, Teplyk Raion, Vinnytsia Oblast (Note: The name of this element is currently outdated. As the result of the 2020 administrative reform in Ukraine, the Teplyk Raion (district) where the village of Rozkoshivka was located was merged into Haisyn Raion.) Великоднє гуляння «Водити Володара» в селі Розкошівка Теплицького району Вінницької області	A group of people holding hands and performing a dance in a circle	13 October 2020	026	The Vodyty Volodara (lit. 'Lead the Lord') ritual lasts for a total of three days. Starting from Easter, locals of Rozkoshivka, Haisyn Raion, Vinnytsia Oblast, gather on the site of the former church and perform traditional khorovod dances, songs, and games. On the last day of festivities, the villagers carry out the ritual of Dovhoi Lozy (lit. 'Long Vine'). It starts with one couple standing with their hands joined above their heads. The next pair of people run under their arms and stand in front, with everyone singing a song specific to this ritual. As more join in, a human chain is formed, leading to the center of the village.
Tradition of Yavoriv pie cooking Традиція приготування яворівського пирога	A piece of Yavoriv pie with meat and gravy	6 July 2022	027	While its name implies that its origins trace back to the city of Yavoriv, this pie is widespread in the entirety of Lviv Oblast and neighboring regions. This dish consists of a mashed potato and buckwheat filling encased in a crust. Yavoriv pie may be eaten on its own, but it is commonly served with sour cream, porcini mushroom sauce, kholodets (aspic), or borscht. It is often cooked during Lent and celebrations.
Making the spherical Christmas star from the village of Matskovychi Створення об'ємної сферичної різдвяної звізди села Мацьковичі	A group of people holding Christmas stars	6 July 2022	028	This tradition originally comes from the village of Matskovychi (now Maćkowice, Poland). After World War II, Ukrainians were forcibly resettled out of Poland, with the residents of Matskovychi ending up in Dubliany and Hamaliivka, where they continue making their Christmas stars to this day. These star-shaped objects attached to long sticks have a distinct spherical form and play a crucial role in local Christmas caroling.
Knowledge and practice of Sakhnovshchyna korovai cooking Знання і практики приготування сахновщинського короваю	A richly decorated bread	6 July 2022	029	In Sakhnovshchyna and its surroundings, korovai (richly decorated ritual bread) is cooked on weddings, fairs, and other special occasions. Common dough decorations that are placed on top have the shape of ears of cereal, guelder-rose berries, roses, oak leaves, and poppies, with each decoration carrying a certain meaning. The exact method of cooking the Sakhnovshchyna korovai varies.
New Year tradition of Bukovina Malanka Новорічна традиція буковинського маланкування	A group of women in traditional costumes	6 July 2022	031	While Malanka (New Year's Eve) is celebrated in all of Ukraine, it has special traditions in Bukovina. The premise of the celebration is that Vasyl or Vasylko (a boy from the Earth world) and Malanka (a beautiful otherworldly creature) want to get married, and their entourage dresses up in costumes to distract the spirits from taking Malanka back to the underworld. As part of the tradition, people dress up as different stock characters and visit houses. The characters differ from region to region, and may include the King and the Man-Snake (in Putyla); the Old Man, the Old Woman, the Life Guard, and the Young (in Vashkivtsi); Riedzhie and the Winged Bears (in Krasnoilsk), etc. Songs, dances, and games are also part of the celebration.
Characteristics of Klezmer music performance in Podilsk (Kodyma) Raion of Odesa Oblast Особливості виконання клезмерської музики Подільського (Кодимського) району Одеської області		6 July 2022	032	Klezmer is a type of Jewish music that was originally performed at weddings, but it is now commonly heard during holidays and festivals as well. In Kodyma and its surroundings, it has absorbed characteristics from other local peoples, notably Ukrainians and Moldovans. As of 2020, there are nine groups in the region that perform Klezmer music.
"Moshu" Christmas ritual (men's koliada ritual) Різдвяний обряд «Мошу» (обряд чоловічої коляди)	A group of men in military uniforms raising up Moshu while spectators watch the ritual	6 July 2022	033	The main character of this celebration in Orlivka is Moshu (lit. 'Grandfather'), a spirit who is believed to arrive during Christmas. As part of the tradition, the identity of the two men who dress up as Moshu is kept secret, although each has to come from his half of the village – Piatre (Romanian: Piatră) or Pedurie (Pădure). On Christmas Eve, each Moshu goes caroling, accompanied by a group of men in wool coats (since the Soviet period – military uniforms). On 25 December, the two Moshus meet up in the center of the village and perform a specific ritual. The celebration culminates in a fight between the Moshus, when each is raised up by his respective entourage and attempts to push the other down to the ground.
Knowledge, skills, and practices concerning Biliaivka fish yushka cooking and eating Знання, вміння та практики, що стосуються приготування та споживання біляївської рибної юшки		6 July 2022	034	Fish yushka (clear soup) from Biliaivka does not have a single recipe, but it plays an important social role in the city. Normally, root vegetables and freshly caught fish are used to cook the dish. The broth of the soup is served separately from the fish and vegetables. In addition, a special sauce called salamur made of garlic, tomatoes, pepper, salt, and a small amount of broth may be added to the broth or fish after serving.
Milina – knowledge, skills, and rituals Міліна – знання, навички та звичаї	A pastry	6 July 2022	036	This rolled or layered pastry made by Bessarabian Bulgarians is filled with cheese, eggs, sour cream, and sometimes fruits. Milina is cooked during celebrations, including holidays, weddings, and christenings. In Kamchyk, cherry twigs are baked into the dish on New Year, which are then used in fortune-telling. In some families, this tradition was modified, replacing the twigs with small papers with wishes written on them.
Dry stone method of construction Метод будівництва «суха кладка»	A dry stone fence in front of a tree	6 July 2022	037	Odesa Oblast is rich in sandstone that is locally called dykun, making it a common building material in the region. The dry stone construction method involves using pieces of rock without any mortar, although rarely a mixture of sand, lime, water, and clay called chamur may be used. The stones need to be specially chosen and placed to ensure stability. Dry stone is used for the construction of walls, roads, and fences, as well as to prevent landslides.
Buzynnyk – an elderberry dessert, traditions of cooking and eating Бузинник – десертна страва з бузини, традиції приготування та споживання	A bowl filled with a black dessert	6 July 2022	038	This elderberry-based dessert originates from Helmiaziv rural hromada in Cherkasy Oblast. Apples, pears, and optionally plums are added during the cooking process. When the dish reaches the right consistency, sugar and a thickening agent (flour or semolina) are added. Buzynnyk is eaten cold on its own or as a spread on bread. It is often shared among family members and guests. This dish is considered to have healing properties as it contains elderberries, which are used in local traditional medicine.
Tradition of cooking the ritual dish "krupky" in the village of Mostove, Andrushivka hromada, Zhytomyr Oblast Традиція приготування обрядової страви «крупки» с. Мостове Андрушівської громади Житомирської області	A woman rolling dough balls on a wooden board while other women stand behind and sing	6 July 2022	039	The preparation of this dish from Mostove begins with pouring millet onto a special wooden board. It is then moisturized with a small amount of beaten eggs, after which flour is gradually incorporated as the millet is rolled with hands against the board. This process is repeated multiple times over a period of two hours until small balls of dough called krupky are formed. These are then boiled in chicken broth until they double in size. This dish is traditionally served on ceremonial occasions such as weddings and christenings.
Art of making the Yavoriv wooden toy Мистецтво виготовлення яворівської дерев'яної забавки	A horse-shaped wooden toy with wheels	6 July 2022	040	These painted toys from Yavoriv, crafted from aspen or lime wood, originate from the 17th century. They are decorated in a palette of red, green, blue, and yellow, the latter often used as the background color. The toys come in different forms, such as furniture, horse-drawn carts, birds, musical instruments, and cradles.
Tradition of vine weaving in the village of Iza, Khust Raion Традиція лозоплетіння в с. Іза Хустського району	A collection of vine baskets	6 July 2022	042	Vine weaving emerged in Iza in the 19th century, and by the early 20th century, the village has become the regional center of this craft. The vines are harvested, de-barked, dried, sorted by size, and then soaked in water to enhance their flexibility. The local woven items include baskets, furniture, souvenirs, and household goods.
Hutsul bryndzia Гуцульська бриндзя	A man mixing curd with a big wooden spoon	6 July 2022	044	The milk that is used to make this type of bryndza (cheese) comes from a local breed of sheep that graze on Carpathian montane meadows no lower than 700 m above sea level. The fresh milk is curdled with the addition of a specific amount of rennet. After the whey is drained out from the curd, the fresh cheese is dried for about two weeks, ground with salt, and then stored in barrels. Hutsul sheep bryndzia has an appellation of origin in Ukraine, meaning that all stages of its production process are guaranteed to take place in its area of origin, which exclusively determines the product's characteristic qualities.
Culture of platsynda cooking and eating in the villages of Frumushika river valley Культура приготування та споживання плацинди у селах долини річки Фрумушика	A pastry with cheese	6 July 2022	045	Platsynda (Romanian: Plăcintă) is a Moldovan and Romanian pastry made of lean dough. A multitude of fillings exists, including apple, bryndza, cabbage, chocolate, pumpkin, and urda with dill. The simplicity of its preparation and the cheapness of its ingredients make platsynda a common everyday dish that may be shared with the family or taken to work. This element covers this dish's cooking culture in the villages of Novi Kaplany and Semysotka, and the settlement of Frumushyka-Nova.
Ukrainian pysanka: tradition and art ↑ Українська писанка: традиція і мистецтво	A collection of painted eggs	6 July 2022	046	To create pysanky, eggs are partially covered in wax using a pysachok (stylus) and dipped in dye to produce colorful patterns and ornaments that may carry symbolic meaning. Even though it was almost completely erased in the Soviet Union, the tradition of making pysanky has become popular again throughout Ukraine following independence. Nowadays, the tradition is associated with Easter and can also be found in the Ukrainian diaspora, especially in Estonia.
Tree beekeeping of Kyiv Oblast Бортництво Київської області	A tree beehive	6 July 2022	047	Although tree beekeeping nearly vanished in Kyiv Oblast as the result of the Chernobyl disaster in 1986, it has survived in a few villages around Ivankiv. This region's method of beekeeping is different from that of Rivne and Zhytomyr oblasts, as it is adapted to the local landscape with a sparse tree distribution.
Tradition of straw plaiting in Turiisk hromada of Volyn Oblast Традиція соломоплетіння у Турійській громаді Волинської області	Three angel figurines made of straw	25 July 2022	048	In Turiisk settlement hromada, straw of different cereals (wheat, rye, barley, triticale) is used to plait household objects and decorations, including plates, baskets, chests, head wreaths, and dolls. Special Christmas decorations from this region include the didukh (sheaf placed in the corner of the house) and pavuk (spider-shaped object hung from the ceiling), which are believed to bring good harvest next year. Straw-plaited crowns are used in the region's wedding ceremonies.
Plum lekvar – tradition of cooking and culture of eating in Zakarpattia Сливовий леквар – традиція приготування та культура споживання на Закарпатті	A collection of jars of jam	25 July 2022	050	Lekvar is a sugar-free fruit spread made by the Hungarian minority of Zakarpattia Oblast. After 7–30 hours of slow cooking in a large pot, the prune plums turn into a dark blue homogeneous paste that can be eaten on its own or added to other dishes. The geography of the region affects the taste of the final product, as plums growing in the mountains are considerably sourer and less sweet compared to those from the lowland.
Ceremony of "zasivannia with a horse in the village of Vistria, Chortkiv Raion, Ternopil Oblast" Обряд «засівання з конем у селі Вістря Чортківського району Тернопільської області»	A group of men in traditional costumes and a horse	24 October 2022	051	During zasivannia (lit. 'sowing'), a group of young men visits the houses of unmarried young women on New Year. In Vistria, they are joined by a horse, which is specially trained beforehand to walk indoors and tolerate loud music. The ritual itself begins at night, with the men playing music while walking through the village with the horse. Once the group is invited into a house, the sower enters first, whose role is to sprinkle grain and nuts on the floor while singing a wish for good harvest in the new year. The rest of the group follows, singing and playing instruments. The host feeds the horse with hay, and then one man from the group invites the unmarried woman to dance. After the dance ends, the young woman rides out of the house on the horse, which symbolizes a prompt marriage. When they finish visiting houses, the men also "sow" and sing in the village council building and two churches, but do not bring the horse inside. After the ritual is over, the youth gathers in the club building to party.
Traditional ritual bread of Vinnytsia Oblast Традиційний обрядовий хліб Вінниччини	A richly decorated bread	23 December 2022	052	Vinnytsia Oblast is home to a variety of breads that are tied to specific traditions. They include the ubiquitous korovai, which is baked on weddings; festive pyrizhky with buckwheat and cheese from Honcharivka; pyrih-rid, prepared by baking several small buns into a single pie; kalach with kacheniata (sigma-shaped surface ornaments), which is given to the bride's family elder as a wedding invitation in Baikivka; divotstvo from Zarichne, where dough is wrapped around a tree branch and eaten after the ceremony of unbraiding the bride's hair; and pobihushchi kalachi, baked for the older bridesmaids in Antonivka, Antopil, and Stina.
Kobzarstvo ↑ Кобзарство	A man playing a bandura	23 December 2022	053	Players of kobza and wheel lyre, known as kobzari and lirnyky, were visually impaired travelling musicians that formed guilds. Their repertoire included historic and religious songs, as well as dumy (epic poems). Their musical tradition called kobzarstvo emerged in the 16th century and continued until the early 19th century. Despite the persecution of the kobzari in early period of the Soviet Union, the tradition has survived with the re-establishment of kobzar guilds in the 1980s and the popularization of the tradition in the modern era.
Upper Sannian dialect in the region around Mostyska Надсянська говірка на теренах Мостищини	Map of Ukrainian dialects, with the Upper Sannian dialect taking up a strip of land near the Polish border	23 December 2022	056	This dialect of the Ukrainian language is spoken around the San River. It was historically found in the surroundings of Przemyśl and Jarosław in modern-day Poland. However, since the deportation of Ukrainians from Poland in 1947, its area (indicated by number 10 on the map) has become limited to villages around Mostyska in Lviv Oblast. The Upper Sannian dialect may be considered transitional between Dniestrian and Lemko dialects with Polish influence. Some of this dialect's phonological changes are /kɪ, ɦɪ, xɪ/ to /ki, ɦi, xi/; unstressed /e/ and /o/ to /i/ and /ʊ/; and /ʲɑ/ to /ʲɛ/. (Note: See Help:IPA/Ukrainian and Ukrainian phonology for clarification on the pronunciation.)
Bukovinian and Bessarabian taistra: traditions of making and using in daily life Буковинська та бессарабська тайстра: традиції виготовлення та побутування	Two women, the one on the right wearing a traditional bag	27 January 2023	059	Taistra (pictured on the right) is a traditional woven bag worn over the shoulder found in modern-day Chernivtsi Oblast (parts of the historic regions of Bukovina and Bessarabia). Although taistry have developed complex ornaments only in the late 19th century, they have preserved their roles in everyday life as containers, in wedding and memorial ceremonies as parts of the costume, and in the representation of the local culture. The exact ornament varies greatly from region to region and may feature geometric, solar, floral, zoomorphic, and anthropomorphic motifs made of threads of various colors and materials.
Tradition of cooking and eating Saint George's Day ritual breads in the village of Krynychne Традиція приготування та споживання обрядових хлібів до Дня Святого Георгія села Криничне		17 February 2023	062	Bulgarians of Krynychne in Odesa Oblast have baked ritual breads on Saint George's Day for almost 200 years. These include bogovitsa, a slightly flat, round bread decorated with a flower-like dough ornament that symbolizes God and Mary; rangel, made of interwined pieces of dough with a hole in the middle, in which a container with wine is placed, which symbolizes Saint George; karavai, a tall bread made of many interwined pieces of dough; and ushcharka, a round bread with shepherd-themed ornaments. All of the breads are made from the same dough, which is prepared in advance. The breads are central to the holiday's celebration and are shared among guests.
Traditions of reed weaving Традиції рогозоплетіння	Baskets and shoes made of reeds	4 May 2023	064	Reed weaving in the villages of Shchitky and Pysarivka in Vinnytsia Oblast dates back to the 17th century. In preparation of the process, reed stalks are collected, dried, and soaked to improve flexibility. Traditionally, the objects are hand-woven spirally around a piece of wood with a specific shape. The handicrafts include trapetsiia, a simple basket with handles; barylko, a small oval basket; poltavka, a type of basket woven on a loom; lapti, shoes normally worn indoors; matka, a doormat featuring a special complex ornament; as well as hats, clothing, and other items. Dried reed leaves are also sometimes used to decorate the objects.
Tradition of grave cross decoration in Rivne Polissia Традиція наряджання могильних хрестів на Рівненському Поліссі	Wooden grave crosses decorated with ribbons	4 May 2023	065	Locals of northern Rivne Oblast decorate grave crosses on Holy Saturday to honor the dead and prevent them from bringing negative influence. As part of this tradition, ribbons are tied to the crosses, with bright colors used for women's graves and darker ones for men's. Around Berezne, pieces of tulle netting are sometimes used as well. These practices, now the most common forms of decoration, have replaced the earlier similar usage of decorated towels, aprons, and scarves. As the cross is regarded as a talisman against evil spirits, its decoration is also believed to extend protection to those who embellish it.
Cooking of holubtsi, a traditional Ukrainian dish Приготування української традиційної страви «Голубці»	Cabbage rolls with a dollop of sour cream	4 May 2023	066	Holubtsi are the Ukrainian version of stuffed leaves. They are most commonly prepared by filling cabbage leaves with a mixture of ground meat, fried vegetables (usually carrots and onions), and grain (rice, millet, buckwheat, or wheat), then stewing them in a tomato-based broth. The size of the rolls differs depending on the region. Numerous variations exist, including vegetarian, pickled, and sweet versions, as well as linyvi (lazy) holubtsi, in which all ingredients are mixed together and cooked into a stew. The dish varies regionally; for example, in Radyvyliv and its surroundings, holubtsi are stuffed into mlyntsi (crêpes) before being wrapped in cabbage leaves and cooked, while in southern Bessarabia, grape leaves are preferred to cabbage.
Culture of the traditional sheep farming in Bessarabia and the knowledge related to it Культура традиційного вівчарства Бессарабії та знання, пов'язані з ним	Sheep herding in the steppe	4 May 2023	067	Sheep farming has long been a central part of daily life for the Bulgarian, Gagauz, Moldovan, and Ukrainian rural communities of southern Bessarabia. Locals divide the year into four periods, determined by whether the sheep are kept in stalls or sent to pasture. Sheep milk is used to produce brynza, and the leftover whey is made into vurda. Mutton is among the region's most consumed meats and appears in numerous local dishes. Wool and sheepskin are used for clothing, bed sheets, and carpets. The most important annual holiday in southern Bessarabia is Saint George's Day, as Saint George is regarded as the patron of shepherds.
Tradition of congratulating Vasyls in the village of Lypivka, Rohatyn urban hromada, Ivano-Frankivsk Oblast Традиція повіншування Василів у селі Липівка Рогатинської територіальної громади Івано-Франківської області		4 May 2023	068	In Lypivka, men and women in traditional clothing go caroling on Saint Basil's Day and visit every Vasyl (Basil) and Vasylyna in the village to offer congratulations (vinshuvannia). This tradition originates from the long-standing popularity of these names in the village. The group enters each house, led by two people carrying the Christmas star and gregor (a large wreath made of pine branches, wheat ears, and guelder-rose berries). They sing the old local song Izlyiashche blahodat. The gregor is placed over Vasyl's or Vasylyna's body, their feet are bound with hay, and they are given the Christmas star. Then, the group performs a khorovod dance while singing Mnohaya lita. This tradition was banned during the Soviet period but revived in 1990.
Bukovinian memorial tree with gifts Буковинське поминальне деревце з дарами	Breads and candies strung on vertical sticks	25 May 2023	069	In Bukovina, special offerings called memorial trees are made for funeral rites as gifts to the dead. They may be made with specially baked breads, cookies, candies, flowers, and other items. Their exact composition differs regionally, with at least seven known distinct types. Common elements include items that symbolize birds, angels, crosses, and keys and ladders to heaven.
Tradition of Hutsul artistic wood carving Традиція гуцульського художнього дереворізьблення	A collection of carved wooden objects	12 July 2023	071	Hutsul carving is distinguished by its complexity that results from the combination of multiple techniques. Geometric ornaments are created from intersecting horizontal, vertical, and diagonal lines, with common motifs bearing specific names. In addition to household objects such as furniture and dishes, sacral (crosses, icons, iconostases), ritual (Easter baskets, wooden pysanky, wedding trays), and musical (violins, horns, trembity) items often feature carved ornaments.
Traditional Malanka ritual in the village of Beleluia, Ivano-Frankivsk Oblast Традиційний обряд Маланка с. Белелуя Івано-Франківської області	A group of people in festive costumes	12 July 2023	072	The celebration of Malanka in Beleluia takes place on New Year's Eve. Groups of people go caroling in costume, portraying stock characters such as Malanka and Vasyl (the holiday's central figures), the Old Man and Woman, the Roma Man and Woman, the Bear (traditionally wearing a gas mask since World War II), the Jew, and Death. Normally, there are three such groups, each confined to a certain part of the village (Berestiv, Sokivna, or Velykyi). The main part of a costume is the mask, which is often passed down through generations or specially in preparation to the event. This tradition endured during the Soviet period despite the government's attempts to restrict or ban it.
Traditional women's bead jewelry in Prykarpattia Традиційні жіночі прикраси із бісеру на Прикарпатті	A collection of bead necklaces	12 July 2023	073	Gerdan (also called sylianka, stronchka, or luchka) is a ribbon-shaped women's ornament from Pokuttia and the Boyko and Hutsul regions, crafted from colored beads (patsiorky) arranged into vibrant patterns. It is worn around the neck or across the forehead. The colors and patterns, which vary regionally, often carry symbolic meaning.
Tradition and technique of women's shirts embroidery in the Hadiach region Традиція і технологія вишивки жіночої сорочки на Гадяччині	An embroided women's shirt	12 July 2023	074	Women's shirts from Hadiach and the neighboring villages are often embroided with indigo threads, an uncommon material in Ukraine that was historically supplied by Jews, hence the garment's old local name "Jewish shirt" and the decline of the tradition in the 1940s following the Holocaust in Ukraine. Over time, the local embroidery technique and the use of indigo dye spread and can now be found in other regions of the country.
Ceremony of cooking zlyvana kasha Обряд приготування зливаної каші	A pot of porridge over a fire	26 July 2023	076	Zlyvana kasha is a savory porridge from Karnaukhivka, Dnipropetrovsk Oblast, prepared in a large pot over a fire by a big group of people. It is usually cooked in spring after the completion of field work. Since the dish is made with whatever ingredients participants bring, and it does not have a fixed recipe, but may include millet, rice, potatoes, salo, chicken, eggs, onions, and spices. This ceremony is an important social event, accompanied by singing and dancing.
Technology of cooking the ritual drink "Varena" in the village of Boromlia Технологія приготування обрядового напою «Варена» в селі Боромля		26 July 2023	077	This drink is cooked in Boromlia on the first and second Sunday after Easter to commemorate the dead. Varena is made by boiling a mixture of water, sugar, dried sour cherries or blackcurrants, mint, blackcurrant leaves, and honey for 20 minutes, and then adding a hot pepper into the warm liquid to give it a slight spiciness. The drink is filtered and cooled before being consumed alongside the food that the locals bring to the cemetery during the commemoration.
Tradition and technique of making Obukhiv "sewn" rushnyk Традиція і технологія виготовлення Обухівського «шитого» рушника	A towel being embroided with red string	12 December 2023	081	This rushnyk (ritual towel) from Obukhiv and the surrounding villages is called "sewn" because its embossed emboroidery covers the fabric in a way that makes it look stitched. Obukhiv towels are widely used in local wedding ceremonies and for decorating the house. Their design typically features complex tree-of-life motifs on both ends and a simpler floral pattern in the middle section.
Traditional holiday of "Mira" Традиційне свято «Міра»		26 December 2023	083	On the Hutsul holiday of Mira (lit. 'measurement'), sheep owners gather together and milk their ewes. Then, vatah (the main shepherd) measures the yield from each animal. This measurement determines how much bryndza and vurda the shepherds, who care for the flocks over the summer, have to bring to the owners. Mira concludes with a priest blessing the sheep before they are sent off to the pasture. This event may take place several times a year depending on the total number of sheep.
Traditional weaving in Kamin-Kashyrskyi hromada Традиційне ткацтво у Камінь-Каширській громаді		26 December 2023	084	In the villages of the Kamin-Kashyrskyi urban hromada, homemade flax, wool, or hemp threads are used to weave a variety of items, including carpets, mats, towels, and, less commonly, clothing. These objects may be plain or decorated, the latter featuring simple yet vivid ornaments. A common feature is the use of contrasting colors, such as red and black, which distinguishes it from other weaving traditions in Volyn Oblast.
Tradition of the Generous Evening in Ukraine Традиція Щедрого вечора в Україні	A drawing of a group of men in costumes singing in a winter village setting	26 December 2023	085	The Generous Evening (Shchedryi vechir), or Malanka, is celebrated on New Year's Eve when groups of people visit houses and sing carols called shchedrivky (the most famous being Shchedryk). Carolers often dress as stock characters and may bring a goat with them. Many beliefs are tied to this night, including the idea that fortune-telling on New Year's Eve is always accurate. Since the holiday comes after the end of the Christmas fast, meat dishes are especially common, although other traditional foods such as kutia (sweet grain dish) are also prepared. Across Ukraine, a wide variety of unique regional customs is associated with the holiday.
Tradition of drying fruits in the villages of the Okhtyrka region Традиція приготування сушки з фруктів у селах Охтирщини		26 December 2023	086	In the villages around Okhtyrka, apples, pears, plums, and sloes are dried on a sushnia (a special wooden grate heated by an outdoor stove). Wooden boards are placed over the fruit, which are then covered with a blanket or thick cloth. The fire is carefully maintained at the right temperature to ensure proper drying, a process that takes at least one day. The resulting product is different from sun-dried fruit as it has a longer shelf life and a slight smoky aroma.
Tradition of cooking and eating "Zozulia" kasha Традиції приготування та споживання каші «Зозулі»	A bowl of porridge with poppy seeds	23 February 2024	089	The name of this sweet porridge from Yakushyntsi rural hromada in Vinnytsia Oblast comes from the cuckoo (zozulia), as its speckled appearance resembles the bird. It is prepared by cooking millet in milk until semi-soft, then adding eggs, sugar, soaked poppy seeds, and butter. After about 30 minutes, more butter and a pinch of salt are incorporated, followed by further cooking. Zozulia is served hot and often shared among family members.
Traditional folk game of "Ashyk" Традиційна народна гра «Ашик»	Adults and children playing a game of knucklebones	27 May 2024	094	This variation of knucklebones is played by the Gagauz and Bulgarians of southern Bessarabia, mainly in the villages of Horodnie, Kotlovyna, and Vynohradivka. Though the rules vary, the game generally uses sheep talus bones, which are tossed into the air and then caught with one hand. Ashyk is played by men, women, and children alike during gatherings, with tournaments also organized.
Tradition of performing the ritual men's dance "Serben" in the village of Chortovets Традиція виконання ритуального чоловічого танцю «Сербен» у селі Чортовець	A big group of men dancing	27 May 2024	095	This dance from Chortovets is performed by all men and boys of the village, who join hands and move in a circle around a church while singing folk songs. After completing the dance, the group proceeds to the next church and repeats the ritual, with the entire sequence lasting several hours. Serben is performed for a week beginning from Easter. According to a local legend, this dance originated as a gesture of gratitude to the villagers' ancestors for saving the community from a Tatar raid.
Culture of traditional Hutsul cheese shaping Культура традиційної гуцульської сирної пластики	Women holding elaborate objects made of cheese, most in the shape of horses with riders	27 May 2024	096	In several Hutsul villages, cheese is warmed in water until it becomes soft and pliable, and then shaped into various figures, often horses. The exact technique varies from craftsman to craftsman, but the small details are always crafted separately and then attached to form one complex piece. Originally, these items were made by male shepherds tending sheep in the polonyny (montane meadows), but in the early 20th century, the tradition has also spread to women in the villages.
Wedding ritual of "Chytannia korony" Весільний обряд «Читання корони»	A groomsman reading a ritual text	27 May 2024	097	Chytannia korony (lit. 'Reading the crown') is practiced in parts of Rivne and Volyn oblasts, where the groomsman solemnly reads a congratulatory text while the bridesmaids prepare the wedding crown (a head wreath with an evergreen plant woven into it). After each verse, musicians play. During the ritual, the bride sits with her back to the others and her hands interlocked behind her neck. When the reading is complete, the bride's mother places the crown on her daughter's head. The groom then releases the bride's hands, kisses her three times, and puts on her wedding shoes. After receiving the parents' blessings, the couple proceeds to the wedding ceremony.
Tradition of bell ringing in Lviv Традиція дзвонарства у Львові	A big bell in a belltower	24 July 2024	098	Bell ringing in Lviv has long been used to announce important church events such as masses, weddings, and funerals. Over time, a variety of traditional melodies have developed, including blahovist, played daily before liturgy; peredzvin, performed during the blessing of pasky on Easter, on Palm Sunday, and at christenings; and a distinct alarm used to warn of natural disasters or invasions.
Culture of preparation and consumption of "Zasypana kapusta" Культура приготування та споживання «Засипаної капусти»	A bowl of cooked shredded cabbage with millet	24 July 2024	099	This dish from Stryi Raion is prepared by boiling cabbage in water, then in milk, before adding millet and cooking until soft. A mixture of fried onions and sour cream is then incorporated. Optionally, sour cherry or blackcurrant branches may be placed on top for a short time for additional aroma. Zasypana kapusta (lit. 'Filled cabbage') is served with mushroom gravy and shkvarky (fried pieces of salo), and is cooked on both holidays and ordinary days.
Tradition of making the Boyko pysanka using a bulavka Традиція створення бойківської писанки булавкою	Eggs partly covered in wax, ready to be placed in coloring	24 July 2024	100	Traditionally, Boyko women make pysanky before Easter, forming the ornament using a bulavka (needle or sharpened wooden stick). Unlike the more common method of using a pysachok (stylus), this technique produces ornaments formed by droplets rather than continuous lines of wax. Both the details of the ornaments – of which more than a hundred varieties exist – and the colors carry symbolic meaning.
Ritual of installing the "Vikha" in the Pereiaslav region Обряд встановлення «Віхи» на Переяславщині	Men installing a tall log decorated with plants	24 July 2024	101	As part of this ritual with pre-Christian roots, practiced in villages around Pereiaslav during the Green week, men chop down a tall, straight tree 6–16 meters high and strip it of its branches. Women then decorate the log with aromatic herbs and flowers before it is set up in an open area of the village. The decorated log, called vikha or vykha, is guarded overnight by the youth. On Sunday, the community gathers for a shared meal near the vikha, eating boiled potatoes, pyrizhky with sour cherries, nalysnyky with quark, and drinking kompot, uzvar, and nalyvka. Dancing around the vikha follows, and the log usually remains in place until the next Tuesday.
Traditions, knowledge, and skills associated with the Sokal shirt Традиції, знання та уміння, пов'язані із сокальською сорочкою	Fragment of an embroided shirt	24 March 2025	104	The embroided shirts from Sokal and neighboring villages are decorated with black geometric and floral ornaments. A distinctive feature is a long neckline, often fastened with a single button. Traditionally, the shirt is worn with a vest. This style emerged in the 19th century, developing from earlier designs with white embroidery.
Traditions of Christmas Eve and Christmas in Ukraine Традиції Святого вечора та Різдва в Україні	A group of people in traditional costumes in a church	24 March 2025	105	Christmas is one of the most important holidays in Ukraine. On Christmas Eve, families gather for a shared dinner, with the didukh – a wheat decoration symbolizing a good harvest for the next year – placed in the home. The meal is strictly meatless, but on Christmas Day, meat is widely eaten as the period of fasting ends. A portable puppet theater called vertep is performed during the celebrations. On both days, groups of carolers sing koliadky, receiving gifts from the households in return.
Tradition of celebrating Christmas Eve in Ukraine Традиція відзначення Святого вечора в Україні	A selection of traditional Christmas Eve dishes	24 March 2025	106	On Christmas Eve, also called the Holy Evening, a twelve-dish meatless meal is prepared. While the exact foods vary, kutia and uzvar (a drink made by boiling dried fruit) are considered essential. The meal does not begin until the first star appears in the sky. Homes are decorated with a didukh and rushnyky, and families wear specially prepared festive clothing. This celebration is closely related to traditions in Lithuania and Poland, leading the three countries to jointly prepare a transnational nomination for the UNESCO list.
Tradition of Christmas Eve in Bukovina Традиція Святого вечора на Буковині		24 March 2025	107	In Bukovina, the Chirtmas Eve dinner is dedicated to deceased ancestors, whose spirits are believed to attend the meal. For this reason, families often prepare an extra empty seat or leave leftovers on the table for them. Typical dishes include varenyky, mushrooms, fish, beans, knyshi, holubtsi, and beetroot salad, along with the ubiquitous kutia, locally known as pshenytsia. Many traditions are centered around kutia: tossing a spoonful at the ceiling to see if it sticks, which is thought to bring good luck; leaving a few grains in different parts of the house for the spirits; and feeding some to the chickens. It is also customary to place hay under the tablecloth or by the table. After dinner, families share their food with others, as those who do not are believed to attract evil spirits. A children's game in which they imitate chickens is also played, with the intention that chicks hatch early the following year.
Tradition of grazing livestock on the Bukovinian polonyny and Bessarabian styhny in Chernivtsi Oblast Традиція випасання худоби на буковинських полонинах та бессарабських стигнах Чернівецької області		24 March 2025	108	Lituvannia is a period from May to August when shepherds take sheep and cows to montane meadows (polonyny) and live alongside them. During this time, they collect milk and make cheese, which is sold, with the profits given to the animals' owners who in turn pay the shepherds. The conditions of lituvannia have given rise to a distinctive cuisine, holidays, and folk medicine practiced throughout the season.
Tradition of bell ringing in St. Michael's Golden-Domed Monastery: from the nabat to the triple ring of victory Традиція дзвонарства Свято-Михайлівського Золотоверхого монастиря: від набату до тридзвону перемоги	A collection of bells of various sizes in a bell tower	14 May 2025	110	Bell ringing in St. Michael's Golden-Domed Monastery in Kyiv dates back to the 15th–16th centuries, and has continued to develop with the introduction of new bells and techniques. A triple ring is used to announce victory, while nabat, a continuous toll, is sounded on tragic days, such as at the beginning of the Euromaidan protests in 2013. Although the monastery was dissolved and subsequently demolished during the Soviet Union, the tradition of bell ringing was preserved and brought back after the cathedral and its bell tower were reconstructed in 1998.
"Divuvannia" ritual in the city of Bashtanka, Mykolaiv Oblast Обряд «Дівування» у м. Баштанка Миколаївської області	Two women folding long pieces of dough on a tray into various shapes	26 June 2025	111	In Bashtanka, the week before a wedding, seven to fifteen women with successful families are invited to the bride's home, bringing cream, milk, flour, and eggs. These women, called korovainytsi, bake divuvannia – a ritual bread of different shapes, such as bows, lemniscates, hearts, and flowers. Most have holes, so after baking they can be strung and hung on a special rack. Breads in the shape of pigeons and the couple's names are also incorporated into the construction, which is further adorned with colorful ribbons and other decorations. On the wedding day, the rack is placed in front of the couple or on a separate table beside the parabkuvannia, similar breads wrapped around sticks that protrude from the korovai. The breads are distributed among guests on the second day of the celebrations.
Wedding ritual of braiding dolia Весільний обряд заплітання долі	Women sitting at a table and stringing periwinkle leaves into a garland	16 July 2025	113	In Stryi Raion, periwinkle leaves are gathered by the couple, bridesmaids, and groomsmen before the wedding, then washed, dried, and blessed. On Thursday or Friday, women string the leaves and flowers onto a long thread while singing ritual songs, forming a garland called dolia (lit. 'fate'). The bride's parents then take part in the ritual of unbraiding rebraiding her hair, incorporating some of the leaves. The ceremony culminates in posad, when the dolia is symbolically purchased, the parents bless the couple, and the community approves of the marriage. The garland is placed before the newlyweds or under icons.
Tradition and practice of spatial and functional decoration in Mykolaiv Oblast: Tauric painting Традиція і практика просторового та ужиткового оздоблення на Миколаївщині: таврійський розпис	A wall with a blue ornament	12 November 2025	116	This decorative art is characterized by blue ornamentation on a white or light blue background, often depicting marine, floral, and animal motifs. Tauric painting is used to decorate walls, pottery, clothing, toys, and weapons. The name derives from Taurica, the old name of Crimea and its neighboring territories, including the Kinburn Peninsula, where the tradition originated. Today, the tradition is also practiced in Ochakiv, Mykolaiv, and other parts of the region.
Culture of storytelling about the Witch of Konotop Культура побутування бувальщин про конотопську відьму		12 November 2025	117	Belief in witches has existed throughout Ukraine since ancient times. In Konotop, these beliefs became especially prominent after the publication of Hryhorii Kvitka-Osnovianenko's The Witch of Konotop, which inspired various local legends and stories.
Tradition of cooking and eating kyselytsia in the Lemko community Традиція приготування та споживання киселиці в лемківській спільноті		5 January 2026	118	Kyselytsia is a Lemko and Boyko soup or drink made with oat sourdough starter, which optionally includes potatoes, mushrooms, or bryndza.
Kryvulka – Lemko women's pectoral decoration: ornamental traditions and making technique Кривулька – лемківська жіноча нагрудна прикраса: орнаментальні традиції та технологія виготовлення		5 January 2026	119	This women's jewellery is made of beads and, because of its wide circular form, covers the chest, shoulders, and back when worn.
Culture and traditions associated with Easter ritual breads in Bukovina Культура і традиції, пов'язані з Великодніми обрядовими хлібами на Буковині		5 January 2026	120	In Bukovina, it is customary to bake a large variety of breads on Easter. These include numerous types of paska and babka, such as dora, a large bread; rohata paska, decorated with dough ornaments; a tall white babka covered with syta; as well as small rye flatbreads called kukutsy, which are given to children on Maundy Thursday.
Tradition of preparing "shpachky" in Horodyshche region Традиція приготування «шпачків» на Городищині	Small baked buns in a bowl	26 March 2026	121	Shpachky (lit. 'starlings') are small baked buns from Horodyshche and its surroundings similar to pyrizhky filled with potatoes and served with garlic oil. They are traditionally prepared in spring, on Candlemas, during wakes, and before men depart for military service.
Tradition of decorating crosses of the Way of the Cross in the village of Monastyrok, Ternopil Oblast Традиція вбирання хрестів Хресної дороги у селі Монастирок Тернопільської області	Women decorating a cross	26 March 2026	122	On the eve of the Feast of the Cross, women of Monastyrok decorate crosses with flowers and wreaths, as well as icons depicting Stations of the Cross. During the celebration, the residents visit each cross with priests. The tradition was banned in the Soviet Union but restored in the late 1980s.
Tradition of using and art of making the Sokal ceramics Традиція побутування та мистецтво створення сокальської кераміки	White ceramic pitchers, cups, and a plate decorated with images of birds and plants	23 June 2026	123	Sokal has been a center of pottery production since the 15th century and has developed its own style of ceramics decorated with floral and zoomorphic motifs. Yellow, green, and brown paint is applied with wide strokes on a white background. The pots, plates, cups, and other pieces of pottery play utilitarian, ritualistic, and decorative roles.
Tradition of making and gifting ritual Christmas cookies "konyky and baryshni" Традиція виготовлення та дарування обрядового різдвяного печива «коники і баришні»	Children getting ready to decorate horse- and woman-shaped cookies in a master class	23 June 2026	124	On Christmas Eve, horse- and woman-shaped cookies (called konyky and baryshni respectively) are gifted to children in the village of Holovkivka in Kirovohrad Oblast. The cookies are sometimes decorated in colorful glaze, and the exact recipe differs from family to family.
Tradition of serpanok weaving Традиція серпанкового ткацтва	Woman weaving an embroided cloth using a loom	25 September 2026	127	Serpanok is a thin, transluscent cloth from Krupove and other villages in Dubrovytsia urban hromada, Rivne Oblast. It is woven out of flax threads and then sewn into various textile products, including shirts, skirts, and aprons.

=== Inventory of Intangible Cultural Heritage in Need of Urgent Safeguarding ===
The inventory includes elements of intangible cultural heritage that are under threat of disappearing due to hostilities, consequences of Russian occupation, natural impacts, or temporary displacement of population.

Endangered elements recognized by the Ukrainian government
Name	Media	Date inscribed	No.	Description
Oleshnia pottery in Chernihiv Oblast Олешнянське гончарство Чернігівщини		4 July 2019	016	Clay deposits around Oleshnia have been known since the Cossack period. Since then, the village has developed into a pottery center, housing the first official pottery school in the Chernigov Governorate during the Russian Empire, as well as a ceramic workshop under the Soviet Union. Glazed Oleshnia ceramics are decorated with light or dark dots that stand out from the green or brown background, while local terracotta objects are decorated with straight and wavy lines.
Custom and technique of cooking the festive and memorial kasha in the city of Avdiivka, Donetsk Oblast Звичай і технологія приготування святкової та поминальної каші у місті Авдіївка Донецької області	A decorated bowl of yellow porridge	6 July 2022	041	This sweet porridge (kasha) from Avdiivka is traditionally prepared on holidays and wakes. Avdiivka kasha is made by cooking rice with milk, eggs, sugar, butter, and salt. The pot is taken off the stove and covered in pillows for two hours so that the residual heat continues slow-cooking the porridge until it reaches the right consistency. While the original recipe dates back to the late 19th century, this dish regained popularity only in 2018. The tradition of cooking Avdiivka kasha is endangered as the result of the Battle of Avdiivka and the subsequent Russian occupation of the heavily damaged city.
Wedding utiata baking in the village of Richky Випікання весільних утят у селі Річки	A flower-shaped cookie among plastic flowers	23 December 2022	054	Utiata are cookies that are used to decorate the korovai (ritual bread) baked for weddings in Richky, Sumy Oblast. Traditionally, the utiata are prepared on Tuesday or Wednesday, the korovai itself is made on Thursday, and it is subsequently decorated by unmarried women in preparation of the wedding that is held on Friday or Sunday. An even number of these flower-like cookies – at least 12, with the central (pava) being the largest – is placed at the ends of long sticks that protrude from the korovai. The sticks are tied with ribbons, and the spaces between them is filled with colorful paper and artificial flowers. On the wedding day, the utiata are taken home by bridesmaids and groomsmen, as they are considered to bring welfare. The korovai is also shared: half is divided between the bridesmaids, groomsmen, and matchmakers on the first day of the celebration, while the other half is distributed to guests on the second day.
Ritual of "Zelekivka zlyvanka" cooking Обряд приготування страви «Зелеківська зливанка»		23 December 2022	055	The preparation of this dish from the village of Zelekivka in Luhansk Oblast begins with frying meat, salo (cured fatback), onions, and carrots in a pot. Once sufficiently cooked, water and potatoes are added, followed 20 minutes later by millet. Zlyvanka continues simmering at a low temperature until the potatoes and millet are tender. Then, the liquid part of the dish is separated from the solids, hence the name zlyvanka (from zlyvaty, lit. 'pour off'). Shkvarky (fried pieces of salo) are added to the solid portion, while fresh sage flowers are added to both. Minced garlic may optionally be added to the liquid. During Lent, the meat may be omitted or replaced with mushrooms. A richer version of Zelekivka zlyvanka, made for special family occasions, includes kliotsky (pieces of dough). This dish is cooked year-round on holidays and wakes.
Hutsul cooperage Гуцульська боднарка	A wooden bucket with a lid	23 December 2022	057	Cooperage (the craft of using staves to make wooden objects, primarily containers) was already a well-developed and organized trade in Ukraine by the 14th century. In the Hutsul region, types of wood are chosen for different types of objects, and some may be decorated with carved or burnt ornaments. Alongside utalitarian containers such as barrels, buckets, jugs, and salt cellars, local coopers also produce vessels that play ceremonial or sacred functions. These include paskivnyk, which is used for blessing pasky (Easter breads) at the church; blyzniata, a double container symbolizing the wedding pair during the ceremony; and tseber, a large, shallow container used for a variety of purposes, including infant baptism.
Art of making Hlyniany patterned textile Мистецтво виготовлення глинянського візерункового текстилю	A carpet with a geometric ornament attached to a wall, and a loom with a nearly finished carpet with a floral ornament	23 January 2023	058	While Hlyniany produces patterned clothing, towels, curtains, and covers, it is best known for its carpets. Since the opening of a local weaving school in 1885, carpet production has grown into an important craft in the city. The national costume of Hlyniany and its vicinities is also notable for its harmonious blend of embroided, woven, and knitted elements. Hand-woven carpets and other textiles feature a variety of geometric, floral, and thematic ornaments, which require high precision and mastery to create.
Polissian dudka-vykrutka: traditions of making and playing Поліська дудка-викрутка: традиції виготовлення та гри	An elderly man playing a wooden flute	23 January 2023	061	This flute-like instrument was once common throughout northern Rivne Oblast, but nowadays is only found in Myliach and Rokytne hromadas. To make this instrument, cattle herders twist (vykruchuvaty) a branch from a pine tree, hence the name vykrutka. The instrument is crafted exclusively in summer or early fall, when the core can be most easily removed by twisting alone. Once hollowed, the branch is stripped of its bark and has holes cut into it for producing tunes. The playing of dudka-vykrutka is alternated with traditional singing.
Obukhovychi weaving Обуховицьке ткацтво		13 March 2023	063	Looms were once found in almost every house in Obukhovychi, a village now considered the center of weaving and embroidery in Kyiv Polissia. During the Soviet period, a local decorative weaving workshop operated here and exported its products abroad. Various colored threads are used to ornament rushnyky (towels), tablecloths, bed sheets, and other textiles, with the former often featuring alternating rhombic and striped patterns.
Traditional craft of beekeeping in Svatove Raion, Luhansk Oblast Традиційне ремесло бджільництва у Сватівському районі Луганської області		12 July 2023	070	Beekeeping has been practiced in the area of modern-day Svatove Raion since the Cossack era, giving rise to a local legend that Svatove was founded by beekeepers. The craft was economically significant, providing honey – the only available sweetener at the time – and wax, particularly valued for candle-making. Honey is traditionally collected three times a year, with the largest harvest in late summer, when the region's widespread sunflowers bloom. Nowadays, the bee serves as a symbol of Svatove city and raion, reflecting the importance of this tradition.
Bukovina ceremonial vinok with needle grass Буковинський урочистий вінок з ковилою		26 July 2023	075	This vinok (head wreath) features a crown or cylinder of beads decorated with bunches of needle grass. It is worn on by bridesmaids and the bride at weddings, as well as by women on certain holidays. Once widespread throughout Bukovina, the tradition now survives in only four villages: Ridkivtsi, Toporivtsi, Mahala, and Chornivka.
Ritual of "Honinnia hadiuk" Обряд «Гоніння гадюк»	A woman gifting fruits and nuts to boys at the doorstep	20 November 2023	078	Honinnia hadiuk (lit. 'Expulsion of evil spirits'), which is practiced in the village of Andriivka-Klevtsove in Donetsk Oblast and Nyzhnia Duvanka settlement hromada in Luhansk Oblast, takes place at the start of Lent. Men or boys in traditional clothing visit homes and cleanse them of evil spirits (hadiuky) by lightly striking the floors, walls, and furniture inside with willow or aspen branches, beginning in the farthest room and moving clockwise towards the front door. The host then thanks the group and offers gifts such as apples, nuts, or sweets. Today, the tradition is endangered due to the ongoing war, but refugees from Andriivka-Klevtsove continue to practice it in other parts of Ukraine.
Wedding braiding ceremony in the rural settlement of Bilokurakyne Обряд заплітання весільної коси в селищі Білокуракине	Elder bridesmaid braiding the bride's hair while other bridesmaids sing	20 November 2023	080	In Bilokurakyne, the braiding of the bride's hair by the elder bridesmaid is accompanied by the singing of the other bridesmaids. Two colorful ribbons are woven into the braid, carrying deep symbolic meaning in the local culture. Afterwards, the bride's head is adorned with a vinok prepared in advance by the bridesmaids, always incorporating periwinkle and guelder-rose – traditional symbols of marriage.
Lent holubtsi with potatoes, the tradition of preparation and consumption Пісні голубці з картоплею, традиція приготування та споживання	A bowl of cabbage rolls with a dollop of sour cream	12 December 2023	082	Many Boykos and Lemkos were resettled to Donetsk Oblast as a result of the 1951 Polish–Soviet territorial exchange, and the Lemkos of Soniachne, Volnovakha Raion, have preserved the tradition of cooking meatless holubtsi (cabbage rolls) eaten during Lent. The dish is made by boiling cabbage leaves until soft, then wrapping them around a mixture of cooked and raw grated potatoes seasoned with salt, pepper, and garlic. The rolls are then simmered in a tomato broth.
Tradition of herbalism in the Starobilsk region Традиція травництва Старобільського краю		26 December 2023	087	The sandy soils and chalk outcrops around Starobilsk create favorable conditions for the growth of numerous medicinal plants, some of which are only endemic to this area. Over time, this has given rise to a rich tradition of herbalism, with locals developing comprehensive knowledge of the healing properties of plants such as mint, lemon balm, thyme, veronica, St. John's wort, hyssop, plantain, and thuja, along with the optimal methods of preparing and preserving them.
Kobolchyn ceramics Коболчинська кераміка		26 December 2023	088	The extensive clay deposits around Kobolchyn, Chernivtsi Oblast, made pottery the village's main craft at least since the 15th century. This allowed locals to roof their houses with tiles, setting Kobolchyn apart from neighboring villages that used straw. Pots are fired in kilns until they turn red, and then sealed off so the smoke would blacken the surface, after which they can be decorated with colorful patterns. This craft flourished in mid-20th century but later declined, largely due to Soviet government restrictions on local pottery production.
Tradition of cooking zatirka in the village of Kryva Luka Традиція приготування затірки у селі Крива Лука	A bowl of soup surrounded by decorations	23 February 2024	090	The tradition of cooking this soup in Kryva Luka, Donetsk Oblast, dates back to the chumak period. The dough, made from flour, eggs, and salt, is rubbed between the palms continuously for about half an hour until equally sized pellets are formed. Some of these pellets are dried for future use, while the rest are cooked in broth with potatoes and a fried mixture of salo, carrots, and onions. Before serving, zatirka is seasoned with fresh herbs and butter. This element is endangered due to the destruction of buildings and displacement of the population caused by the Russian invasion.
Cultural customs and ways of self-expression associated with the ritual bread of the Nadazovia Greeks (Psatyr) Культурні звичаї та способи самовираження, пов'язані з обрядовим хлібом Надазовських греків (Псатир)	Dough with a particular shape	24 March 2025	109	This Easter bread (pictured uncooked) is prepared by the Ruméika and Urum-speaking Greeks of southwestern Donetsk Oblast. Its form – a central cross surrounded by four crescent-shaped sections – is tied to Christian symbolism, and prayers are recited by the baker throughout the entire process. The tradition of cooking psatyr endures despite the Russian occupation of the region.
Metalworking traditions of the Hutsul region Мосяжні традиції Гуцульщини	A man holding various decorated objects made of a yellow metal	26 June 2025	112	Hutsul metalworking encompasses a wide range of objects, primarily decorative ones. The metal – usually brass (mosiazh) – is worked through different techniques, such as casting, forging, coining, engraving, etching, rolling, and inlay, to produce items that are frequently adorned with traditional Hutsul ornaments.
Tradition of baking and gifting ritual Christmas prianyky in Sloboda Ukraine Традиція випікання та дарування обрядових різдвяних пряників на Слобожанщині	Horse-shaped gingerbreads, decorated with pink frosting and colorful ornaments	16 July 2025	114	These ritual cookies made from lean dough date back to the 18th century. They are prepared every Christmas in parts of Poltava, Sumy, and Kharkiv oblasts, specifically around Kotelva and Krasnokutsk. The prianyky are cut using metal molds in the shapes of ladies (panianky), birds, horses, stars, etc. They are painted with pink, white, blue, and yellow icing.
Traditions of the Pentecost church holiday in the village of Shulhynka, Luhansk Oblast Традиції храмового свята на Трійцю у селі Шульгинка Луганської області	A group of people standing outside in traditional clothing, two holding baskets full of baked goods	16 July 2025	115	This celebration from Shulhynka dates back to 1781, when the construction of the Holy Trinity Church was completed on Pentecost. At dawn, men gather herbs and grasses, such as thyme, mint, sedge, reed, and cattail, which are then made into bouquets – some used to decorate houses and others taken to church. Women bring baked goods, which are blessed by the priest along with the bouquets. After mass, the priest invites everyone to a meal that includes ritual pyrizhky with sopka (a filling of shkvarky, lard, fried onions, and spices) and dried fruits. The rest of the day is spent near the church, with the youth playing games and singing.
Art of making the wedding feather vinok in the village of Velykyi Kliuchiv, Ivano-Frankivsk Oblast Мистецтво виготовлення весільного пір'яного вінка у селі Великий Ключів Івано-Франківської області	A woman in a traditional costume wearing a large wreath made of feathers and beads	23 June 2026	125	The wedding vinok (head wreath) from Velykyi Kliuchiv is made of goose feathers, which are arranged into flower-like shapes, and colorful beads. The tradition of wearing it had almost disappeared by the 1990s and was largely preserved through theatrical re-enactments, becoming popular again as brides' headgear in the 2000s.
Tradition of making and playing Zaporozhian tulumbasy Традиція виготовлення та гри на Запорозьких тулумбасах		23 June 2026	126	Tulumbasy are a type of timpani made by the Zaporozhian Cossacks. In the 16th–18th centuries, they were used for giving signals at war, calling the rada, and accompanying ceremonial processions. Their use declined after the liquidation of the Zaporozhian Sich in 1775, with revitalization efforts underway since 2011, in particular in the city of Zaporizhzhia.
Miners' tales about the guardian spirit Шахтарські бувальщини про духа-охоронця		25 September 2026	128	In the Donbas region, legends and beliefs have formed about a guardian spirit of the mines called Shubin.
Panayir – tradition of Ukrainian Greek celebration Панаїр – традиція святкування греків України	Priest giving blessings during a festival	25 September 2026	129	As part of this celebration, Ukrainian Greeks go to service together. This is then followed by dance, fairs, music, and common preparation and consumption of traditional dishes. The name of the festival comes from the Greek word πανηγύρι, which means "gathering of people". Panayir takes place on the day of the community's patron saint or on other special occasions.

=== Inventory of Proper Practices of Safeguarding Intangible Cultural Heritage ===
The inventory accredits communities and organizations that help to preserve intangible cultural heritage.

Good Safeguarding Practices recognized by the Ukrainian government
Name	Media	Date inscribed	No.	Description
Traditional Kharkiv kots weaving Традиційне харківське коцарство	A wool carpet with an ornament	6 July 2022	030	Kots is a long-pile rug woven on vertical looms that originates from 17th-century Kharkiv, although it has also spread to the nearby Valky and Koviahy. While kots weaving used to flourish in the 19th century when sheep farming was experiencing rapid growth in the region, it declined in late 1900s with the rise of factory production. The tradition survived thanks to conservation efforts by the few surviving masters of the craft, particularly a group led by Iryna Shehda.
Museum of traditional folk art as an interactive space of the intangible cultural heritage of Odesa Oblast Музей традиційного народного мистецтва як інтерактивний простір нематеріальної культурної спадщини Одещини		6 July 2022	035	The Odesa Regional Center of Ukrainian Culture has organized a living museum of traditional folk art, the objectives of which include the research, documentation, presentation, and digitalization of intangible cultural heritage. This museum attempts to popularize the culture of Odesa Oblast by exhibiting various objects connected to the regional cultural elements. Visitors are allowed to interact with some of the items, and the museum offers educational classes.
International Christmas festival "Koliada na Maizliakh" Міжнародний Різдвяний фестиваль «Коляда на Майзлях»	People in traditional costumes in a church, some playing musical instruments	6 July 2022	043	Held every year since 2010 in the Church of Christ the King in Maizli, Ivano-Frankivsk, this Christmas festival is co-organized by the Ivano-Frankivsk Metropolis of the Ukrainian Greek Catholic Church and the Executive Committee of the City Council. Goals of Koliada na Maizliakh include the restoration and preservation of Christmas traditions (particularly koliadky, or carols); promotion of cultural exchange and development of artistic groups; and strengthening international ties, especially with the Ukrainian diaspora. As of 2022, around 500 groups have performed at the festival.
Practice of safeguarding the Goryun culture by "Museum of Goryun Culture" in the village of Nova Sloboda, Konotop Raion, Sumy Oblast Практика з охорони горюнської культури «Музеєм горюнської культури» в селі Нова Слобода Конотопського району Сумської області	Interior of a room in the Museum of Goryun Culture showcasing traditional clothing and furniture	27 January 2023	060	The Museum of Goryun Culture, a branch of the State Historic-Cultural Reserve in Putyvl, researches and presents the culture of the Goryuns, a small local ethnic group. The museum also organizes events aimed at demonstrating, promoting, and raising awareness of the Goryuns' intangible cultural heritage, which includes their dialect; songs, such as shandrovky (New Year songs) and koliadky (Christmas songs); cuisine, including bread and klynukhy (baked goods served with tea); holidays, such as the Kukushka ritual of the Feast of the Ascension; as well as embroidery, weaving, and pottery. The museum has conducted expeditions to the villages of Nova Sloboda, Lynove, Rudnieve, and Buniachyne to document local traditions.
Practice of the protection of traditional crafts and folk art Практика з охорони традиційних ремесел та народного мистецтва	A man teaching boys how to make clay toys	20 November 2023	079	This safeguarding program is conducted since 1990 by the National Union of Masters of Folk Art of Ukraine and its regional offices, in collaboration with masters of folk art, historians, and researchers across the country. The Union carries out research of folk art and intangible cultural heritage, identifies endangered cultural elements, advocates for the preservation of crafts, provides support and protection to certain folk arts, and popularizes both the crafts themselves as well as the masters who practice them.
Practice of safeguarding the "Hutsul pattern (ornament) and the related cultural space" Практика з охорони «Гуцульських узорів (орнаменту) та пов’язаного з ним культурного простору»	A group of people gathered around a desk, holding printouts with Hutsul ornaments	26 April 2024	093	The Junior Academy of Sciences of Ukraine launched this program in 2000 with the research for a textbook on Hutsul ornaments. The Academy explores the ornament's connection to wood, as the patterns were often carved, and examines how climate change and deforestation have affected its development. The ornament is promoted through games, articles, photo exhibitions, and its integration into modern design and art. In 2018, more than 5,000 people attended presentations, exhibitions, discussions, and master classes on the Hutsul ornament, demonstrating the effectiveness of this safeguarding practice.
Program of safeguarding the tradition of covering houses with straw and reeds in the National Museum of Folk Architecture and Folkways of Ukraine Програма з охорони традиції покриття хат соломою та очеретом у Національному музеї народної архітектури та побуту України	A traditional Ukrainian house with straw on its roof	24 July 2024	102	The use of straw or reeds for roofing is a common feature of Ukrainian folk architecture. Since its establishment in 1969, the National Museum of Folk Architecture and Folkways has worked to safeguard this tradition. This open-air museum inherited the techniques from experienced thatchers and has preserved them by applying them to its buildings. In addition, the program seeks to re-popularize this endangered practice by promoting its environmentally friendly aspects.

=== Inventory that Represents the Culture of Indigenous Peoples of Ukraine ===
The inventory highlights elements of intangible cultural heritage that belong to indigenous peoples of Ukraine, which include Crimean Tatars, Crimean Karaites, and Krymchaks. (Note: These three groups are recognized by the Ukrainian Government as the indigenous peoples of Crimea. Since Russia's occupation and internationally unrecognized annexation of the peninsula in 2014, the Autonomous Republic of Crimea and the city of Sevastopol have been disputed, with most countries recognizing the territory as de jure part of Ukraine while de facto it remains under Russian control.)

Indigenous elements recognized by the Ukrainian government
Name	Media	Date inscribed	No.	Description
Örnek, a Crimean Tatar ornament and knowledge about it ↑ Орьнек – кримськотатарський орнамент та знання про нього	A plate with an ornament	12 February 2018	009	This Crimean Tatar design of ornamentation originates from the Crimean Khanate that existed in 15th–18th centuries and was traditionally passed down in craft workshops. Örnek is used in embroidery, weaving, pottery, engraving, jewellery, and wood carving, as well as glass and wall painting. It features floral and geometric motifs. The listing also includes knowledge and understanding of the practice.
Tradition of et ayaklak (Karaim meat pastry) cooking. Experience of the Karaites of Melitopol Традиція приготування ет аяклак (караїмський пиріжок з м’ясом). Досвід караїмів Мелітополя	A small pie on a plate	16 November 2018	013	The Crimean Karaite community in Melitopol was formed in the 19th century, and has preserved the tradition of cooking et ayaklak since the Khazar period (13th century). These small pastries are filled with mutton, although poor families also sometimes add potatoes. The consumption of et ayaklak is accompanied by a specific ritual. They are also made by the Karaites of Lithuania and Poland, where they are named kibinai.
Practice and cultural context of cooking "çiberek" and "yantıq" – traditional Crimean Tatar dishes Практика та культурний контекст приготування «чіберек» та «янтик» - традиційних страв кримських татар	Three big fried dumplings (chebureki) on a plate	25 July 2022	049	Çiberek (also known as cheburek) is a Crimean Tatar deep-fried turnover filled with ground beef or mutton, onions, and optionally spices. A bit of water is added to the filling, creating a small amount of broth on the inside. The dough is made somewhat stiff to prevent the broth from leaking during the cooking process. A similar dish is the yantıq, prepared the same way but cooked in a dry pan without oil, and then smeared with butter. Its filling is more varied and may include cheese and vegetables. Both çiberek and yantıq are gaining popularity in continental Ukraine as they are prepared by Crimean Tatars in restaurants and cafés.
Coffee tradition of Crimean Tatars Кавова традиція кримських татар	A small metal pot filled with coffee resting on hot coals	23 February 2024	091	Coffee was introduced to Crimea from Turkey in the 16th century and has since become an important part of the local culture. Crimean Tatar coffee is prepared in a cezve (copper or silver metal pot with a long handle) over hot coals or sand. The drink is allowed to foam but not boil during cooking, and may be lightly salted. Milk or cream can be added to the coffee before serving it in a filcan (small porcelain cup). While, traditionally, sugar is not mixed into the coffee, a sweet made of sugar and milk may be eaten alongside it. Crimean Tatars usually serve coffee to guests or on holidays and special occasions.
Ağır ava ve Qaytarma – a traditional dance of Crimean Tatars Агир ава ве Кайтарма - традиційний танець кримських татар	Crimean Tatar woman in traditional clothing dancing	23 February 2024	092	Ağır ava ve Qaytarma is a Crimean Tatar wedding dance dating back to the 17th century. Historically, men and women danced separately at public events, including weddings. In some families, the groom and bride danced in the same room but were divided by a thin veil. The groom first performed the slow and calm Ağır ava, while the bride continued with the fast and festive Qaytarma. Since the deportation of the Crimean Tatars in 1944, it has become common for the couple to dance together, resulting in the combination of the two dances. Typically, a Crimean Tatar wedding is divided into three parts, each beginning with Ağır ava ve Qaytarma, followed by variations of Qaytarma.

=== Inventory of Elements that Have Been Revived After the Disappearance of the Tradition ===
The inventory includes elements of intangible cultural heritage that had disappeared but were successfully revived.

Revived elements recognized by the Ukrainian government
Name	Media	Date inscribed	No.	Description
Technique of embroidery "Horodok stitch" ("Horodok stib") Техніка вишивки «Городоцький шов» («городоцький стіб»)	Fragment of an embroided shirt	24 July 2024	103	This embroidery stitch technique from Horodok and nearby villages is known for its dense, complex ornaments. While various thread colors were used, red was predominant. The Horodok stitch was first documented in 1887 at an exhibition of shirts from Kernytsia. Due to its arduousness and the hardships of war, the technique eventually disappeared. Its revival began in 2010, when the Horodok Museum of History and Local Lore received a shirt featuring the stitch, dated to 1910. Annual master classes of Horodok stitch are held on Independence Day in the city to promote the tradition.

== See also ==
- List of Intangible Cultural Heritage elements in Eastern Europe
- List of World Heritage Sites in Ukraine
