= Reshetylivka embroidery =

Embroidery technique from Poltava Oblast

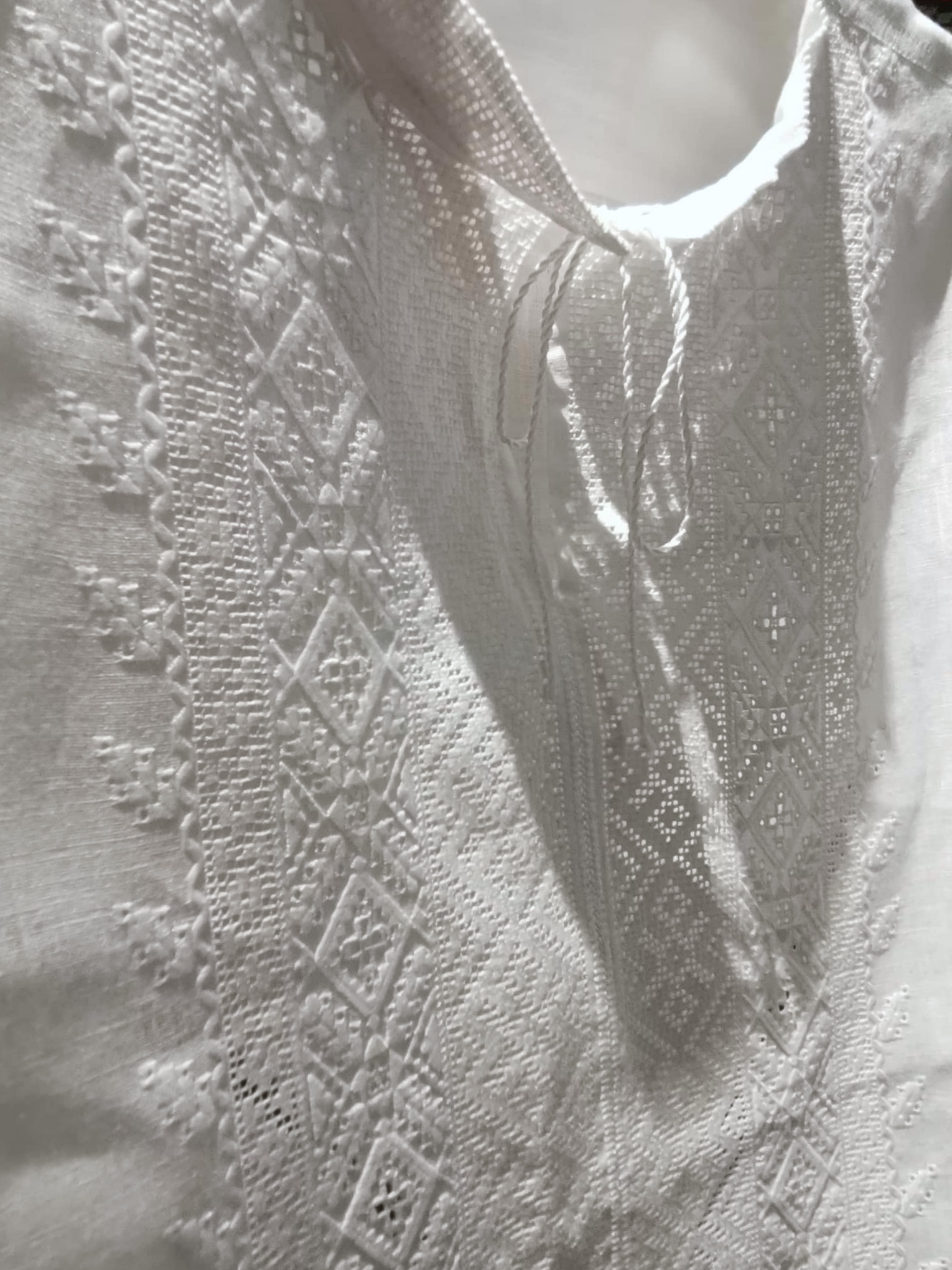
- Fragment of a shirt made in Reshetylivka
- Type: Embroidery
- Material: Linen or cotton
- Production method: Needlework
- Production process: Craft production
- Place of origin: Reshetylivka, Ukraine
- Introduced: c. 1746

Reshetylivka embroidery (Ukrainian: Решетилівська вишивка) or "white on white" embroidery (вишивка «білим по білому») is a technique of embroidery with white threads on white fabric that originated in the city of Reshetylivka in Ukraine, combining up to 5–7 different techniques in one product. It is included in the National Inventory of Intangible Cultural Heritage of Ukraine.

== History ==
Scholars who have researched the history of Reshetylivka believe that the name Reshetylivka comes from the saying ‘to make holes in the fabric’.

One of the oldest examples of Reshetylivka embroidery, which combines white-on-white embroidery with hole-punching, is a Chernihiv towel from 1746, which is kept in the Chernihiv Historical Museum.

Traditionally, the white-on-white technique is used to embroider towels and wedding shirts for men and women.

The peculiarity of Reshetylivka embroidery is a combination of floral and geometric patterns—"periwinkle", "hop", "moroka", "kuriachyi brid", "zozulka", also "branch" and "broken wood".

To contrast the embroidery pattern, the craftsmen add unbleached threads dyed in ashen colors, which creates a relief pattern and looks different depending on the direction of the light. At the end of the 19th century, Reshetylivka became one of the centers of folk weaving, carpet weaving and embroidery in Ukraine.

== Embroidery technique ==
Modern embroiderers: Nadiia Vakulenko, Larysa Piliuhina, and Nina Ipatii believe that embroidery with white threads on white is difficult to perform, as the ornament is not applied to the fabric immediately.

Mastering the traditional techniques of white-on-white embroidery is time-consuming and difficult, so the craft is learned from an early age.

The master first draws an embroidery pattern on paper, then, through a complex calculation, transfers the pattern to the canvas. This painstaking work takes two to six months to complete one garment.

In the 1920s, the village of Reshetylivka gained recognition at exhibitions of Ukrainian art in Munich, Paris, Marseille, and Brussels.

=== Interesting facts ===
- The writer Olena Pchilka was to present at an exhibition in Paris an embroidery in white on white technique made by carvers from the Reshetylivka factory. When the jury did not believe that this embroidery was the work of human hands, the writer brought the carvers.
- In 1969, Reshetylivka craftsmen made a dress for the Italian actress Sophia Loren for filming in the film Sunflower, which took place near Dykanka, Poltava Oblast. Later, the actress showed the dress on the catwalk in Rome. A copy of that shirt is now kept in the Reshetylivka Museum.
- The annual regional festival "Reshetylivka Spring" has been held since 1992.
- In 2017, Reshetylivka embroidery was included in the National Inventory of Intangible Cultural Heritage Elements of Ukraine.
