= Shubin (ghost) =

Mythical spirit in mining towns of the Donbas in Ukraine

Shubin (Ukrainian: Шубін) is the mythological mining spirit. The legend of Shubin is distributed mainly in the mining towns of the Donbas region on the Russia–Ukraine border. In the north one can hear several legends about the spirit of the mines. The spirit is usually good, but can be wicked. There is no single point of view about the etymology of the word.

Explanations include: (1) the nickname of a miner, whose soul, according to legend, walks in a fur coat at the bottom of the mine with a torch in his hand and burns the gas (firedamp); (2) the name of the cruel mining master Shubin, who slew workers underground; (3) the sound from methane (Shu-Shu), which often accumulates in the mines.

In September 2026, miners' tales about the guardian spirit Shubin were inscribed on the National Register of the Intangible Cultural Heritage of Ukraine.

== Literature ==
- O.Forostyuk. Religious Luganschina: a historical and legal aspects. - Lugansk: Svitlycja, 2004.

== Sources ==
- Легенды подземелий ("Legends of the Subterranean") (in Russian)
