= Zatiruha =

Eastern European soup

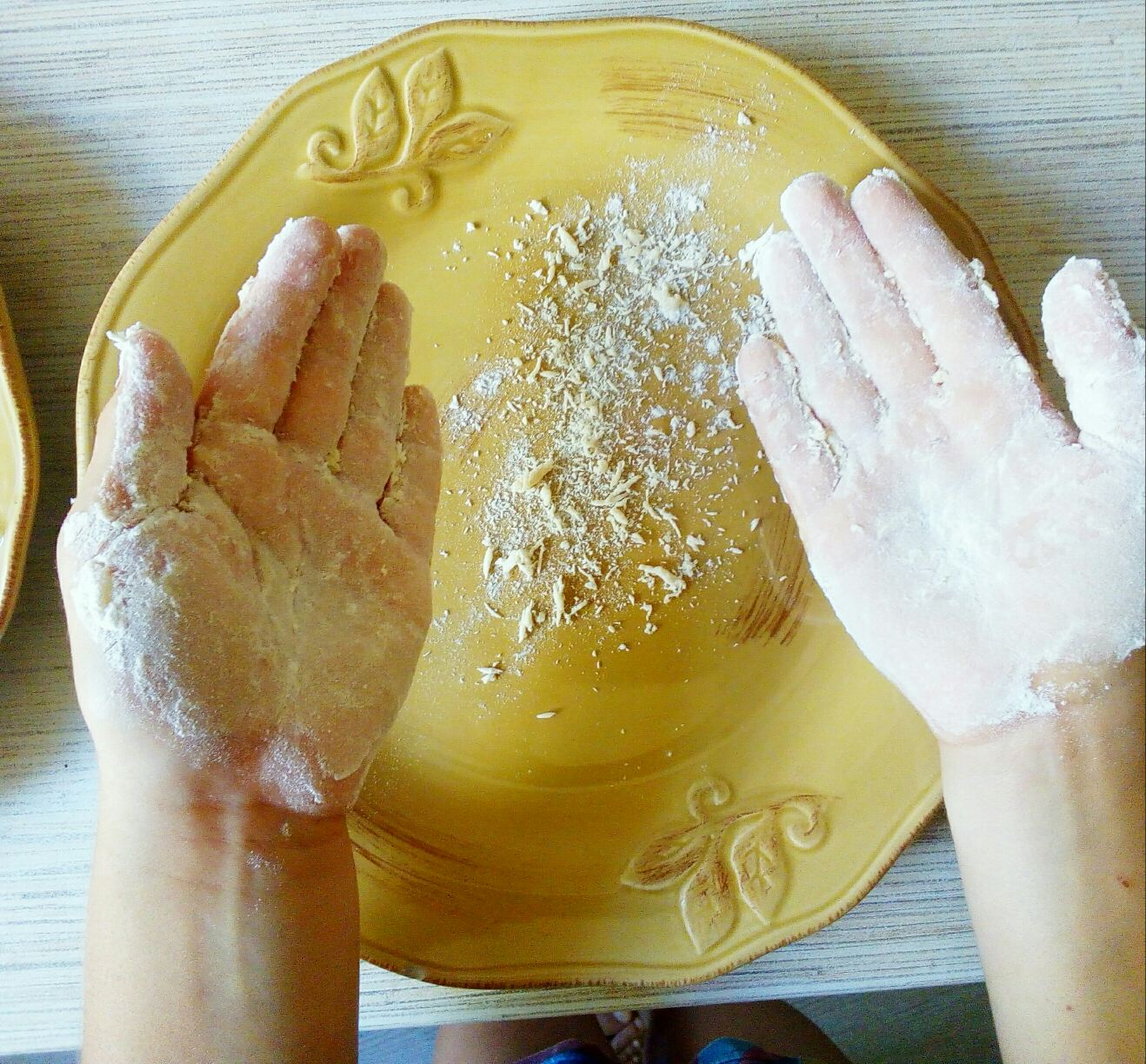
- Making noodles for zatiruha
- Type: Soup
- Place of origin: Eastern Europe
- Associated cuisine: Belarusian, Polish, Russian, Ukrainian
- Serving temperature: Hot or cold
- Main ingredients: Noodle, broth, milk, water

Zatiruha (sometimes zatiukha or zatirukha), also known as zatirka, zatsirka or zacierki is an Eastern European soup with handmade noodles. It is a type of paste soup or flour soup. The name comes from the verb тереть ("to rub"); the noodles are made by rubbing floury hands together to form pellet-like dumplings or noodles. It is considered a peasant dish.

== Regional varieties ==
In Belarus, the dish is known as zatsirka, in Ukraine as zatirka krupky or kachana kasha ("rolled porridge"). A similar dish called umach ashi is known in other countries. In Polish, the dish is known as zacierki (in plural form) and is usually served as a milk soup.

== Origins legend ==
According to legend, after kneading bread dough, a worker in a wealthy house did not wash her hands and so returned to her home, where she rubbed her palms together and boiled the resulting pellets of dough to feed her children.

== Preparation ==
The palms of the hands are dipped into beaten egg, milk or water, then into flour. After that, the palms are rubbed against each other over a plate. The resulting dough pellets are boiled in broth or water. Other ingredients can include potatoes, sautéed onions and carrots, green onions, parsley, dill, bay leaves, and seasoning. Some recipes call for meat or mushrooms. A milk soup or porridge is also made using a similar method.

In Ukrainian cuisine zatirka or kachana kasha is made from millet grains battered with a mix of flour and egg, dried and boiled with meat, traditionally chicken.

== In culture ==
On 26 February 2024, the Ministry of Culture of Ukraine inscribed the tradition of preparation of zatirka in Kryva Luka village in Donetsk Oblast to the National Inventory of Elements of the Intangible Cultural Heritage of Ukraine. Zatirka was prepared at least since chumak times in the region. In Kryva Luka, the dough is rubbed for 30 minutes before pellets of the right size are formed, making the process of preparation rather long. The resulting soup is served with a piece of salo. This element of cultural heritage is in danger due to damage done to the village during Russian invasion of Ukraine.
