= Reshetylivka =

City in Poltava Oblast, Ukraine

Reshetylivka Решетилівка
- City
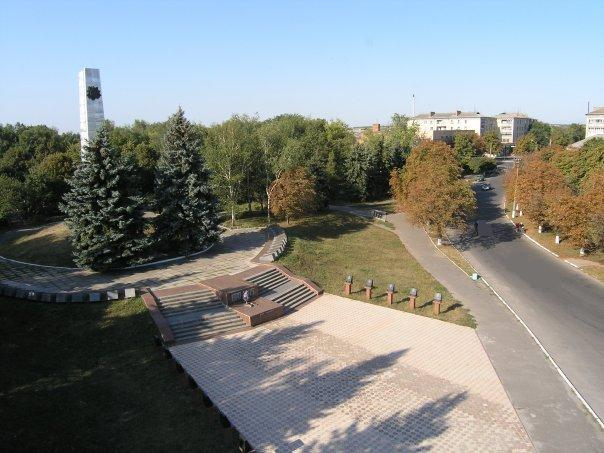

- Flag Coat of arms
- Interactive map of Reshetylivka
- Location of Reshetylivka in Poltava Oblast Location of Reshetylivka in Ukraine
- Coordinates: 49°34′00″N 34°04′00″E
- Country: Ukraine
- Oblast: Poltava Oblast
- Raion: Poltava Raion
- Hromada: Reshetylivka urban hromada
- Founded: 1638

Government
  - Head of city council: Volodymyr Kuzmenko

Area
  - Total: 9.0 km^{2} (3.5 sq mi)
- Elevation: 93 m (305 ft)

Population (2022)
  - Total: 9,021
  - Density: 1,000/km^{2} (2,600/sq mi)
- Time zone: UTC+2 (EET)
  - Summer (DST): UTC+3 (EEST)
- Postal code: 38402
- Area code: 5363
- Licence plate: BI

Reshetylivka (Ukrainian: Решетилівка, IPA: [reʃeˈtɪlʲiu̯kɐ]) is a city located in Poltava Raion of Poltava Oblast in central Ukraine, and formerly the administrative center of Reshetylivka Raion. Population: 9,021 (2022 estimate).

The city is located 10 km (6.2 mi) from Reshetylivka railway station.

== History ==
Reshetylivka was founded in 1638 as a small village.

In 1845 Reshetylivka was visited by Taras Shevchenko, who created two drawings of the town.

During World War II, the town was occupied by the German army on 22 September 1941, and liberated on 24 September 1943.

On 7 November 2017, Reshetylivka was upgraded in status from urban-type settlement to city.

== Demographics ==
Historical population
Year	Pop.	±%
1966	10,100	—
1989	9,552	−5.4%
2001	9,457	−1.0%
2006	9,336	−1.3%
2007	9,297	−0.4%

The population of Reshetylivka as of 2006 was 9,336. The 2007 population is estimated at 9,297. The annual growth rate is -0.28.

== Government ==
The Resehtylivka City Council consists of 30 members elected by citizens of Reshetylivka. The head of the city council since 26 March 2006 has been Volodumyr Viktorovich Kuzmenko. The State Treasury of Ukraine District Department is also located in Reshetylivka.

== Economy ==
=== Agriculture and Food Processing ===
Reshetylivka Butter Making Factory, has operated in the settlement since 1924.

Reshetylivka District Consumers Union and the Reshetylivka Inter-Farm Poultry Incubating Enterprise both are collective businesses which have operated since 1936.

Public Catering Enterprises Association of Reshetylivka District Consumer Union has operated in the settlement since 1973.

=== Banks ===
PRYVATBANK JSCB, Reshetylivka Branch Office, Aval, Reshetylivka Branch Office, Nadra, Idex Bank, OshchadBank are the banks located in the settlement.

=== Industrial organizations ===
Reshetylivka Motor Transport Enterprise No 153 and Raiavtodor Reshetylivka Branch Office of Affiliate Poltavaoblavtodor have both operated since 1976.

Reshetylivka Private Art Handicraft Centre which opened in 1903 is also located in the settlement.

== Education ==
Arts and Crafts School and an Agricultural School operate in the settlement.

== Culture ==
Reshetylivka is known for its white-on-white embroidery and carpets with a floral ornament. Both items are on the National Register of Intangible Cultural Heritage of Ukraine.

== Gallery ==
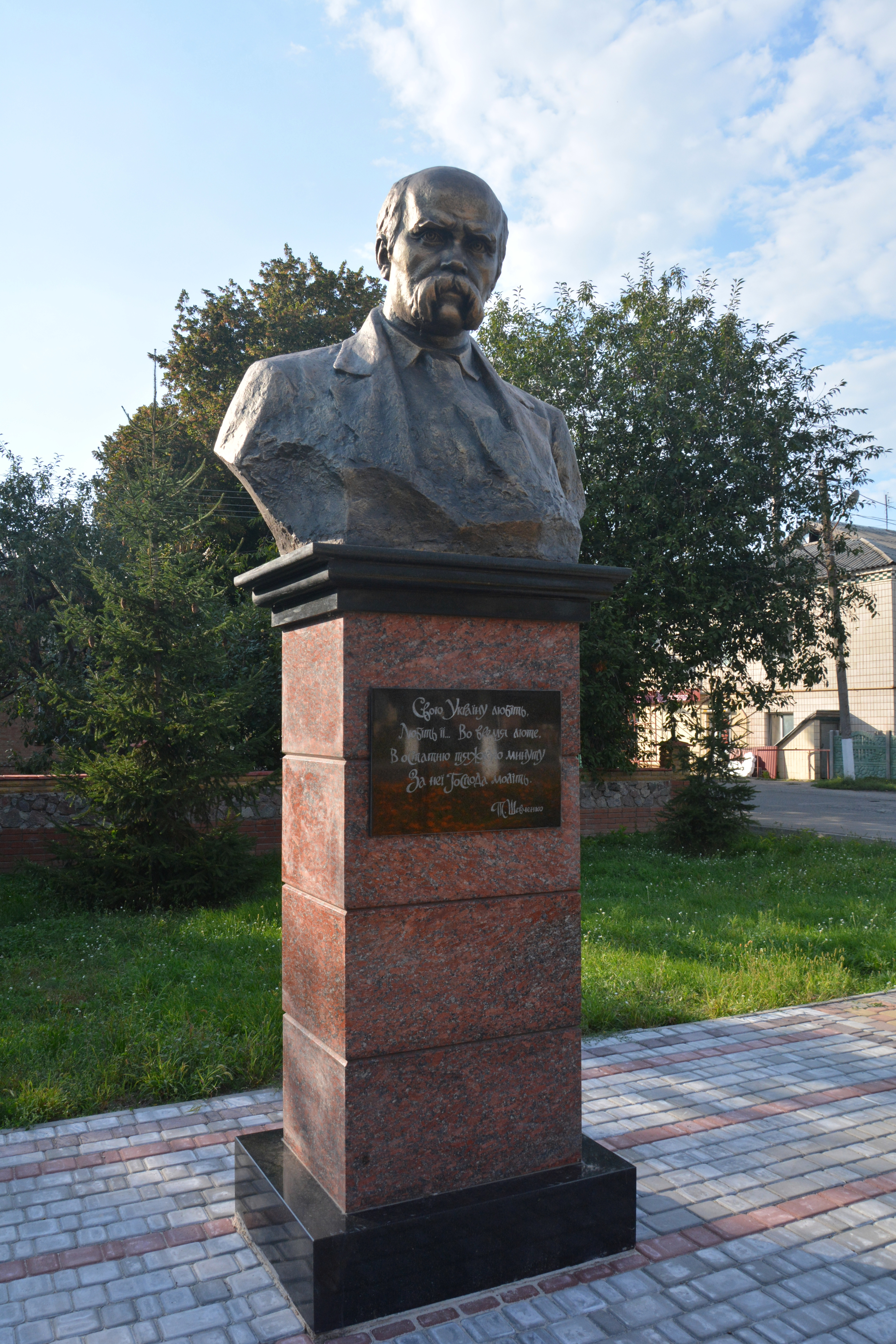
Monument to Taras Shevchenko

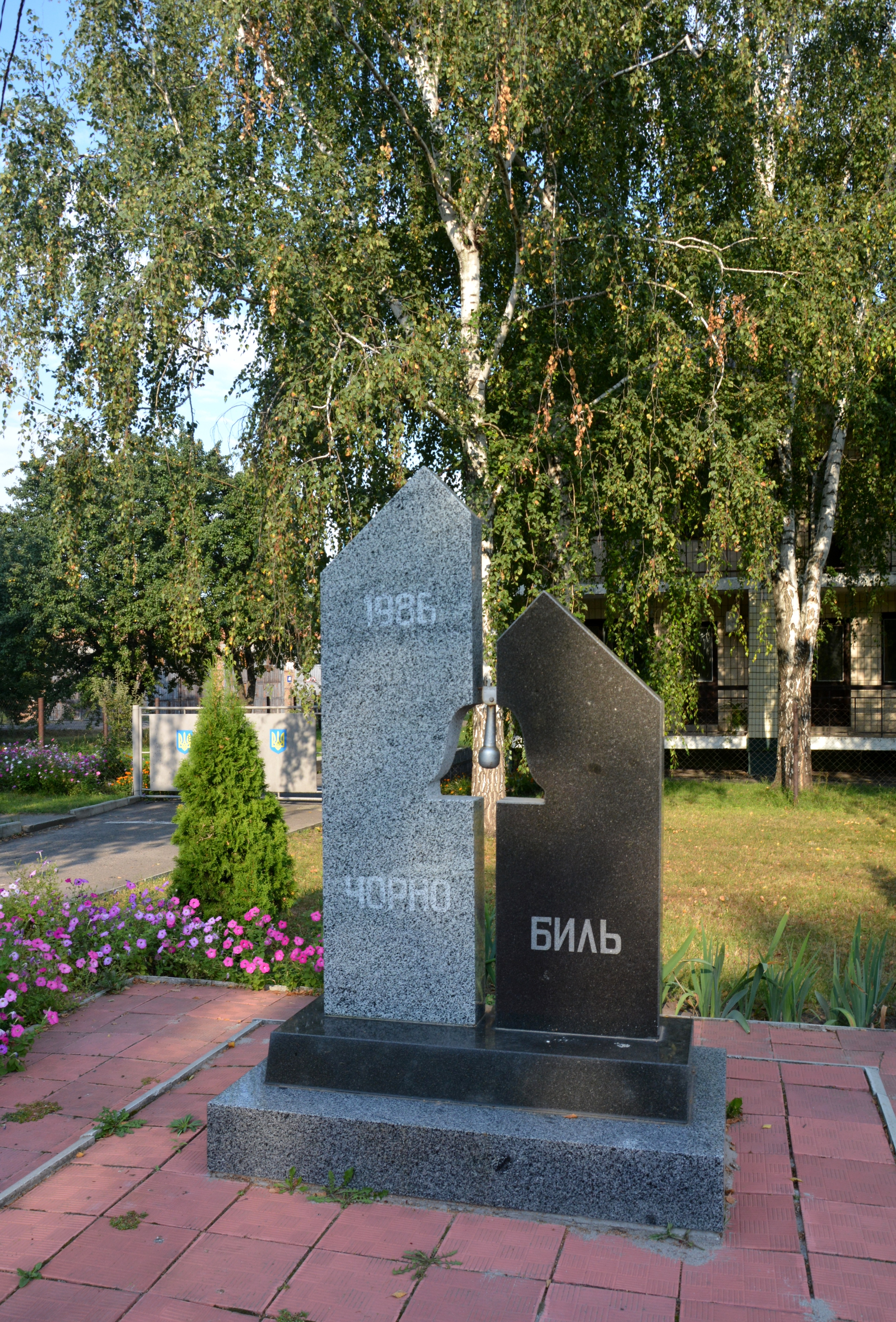
Monument to Chernobyl liquidators

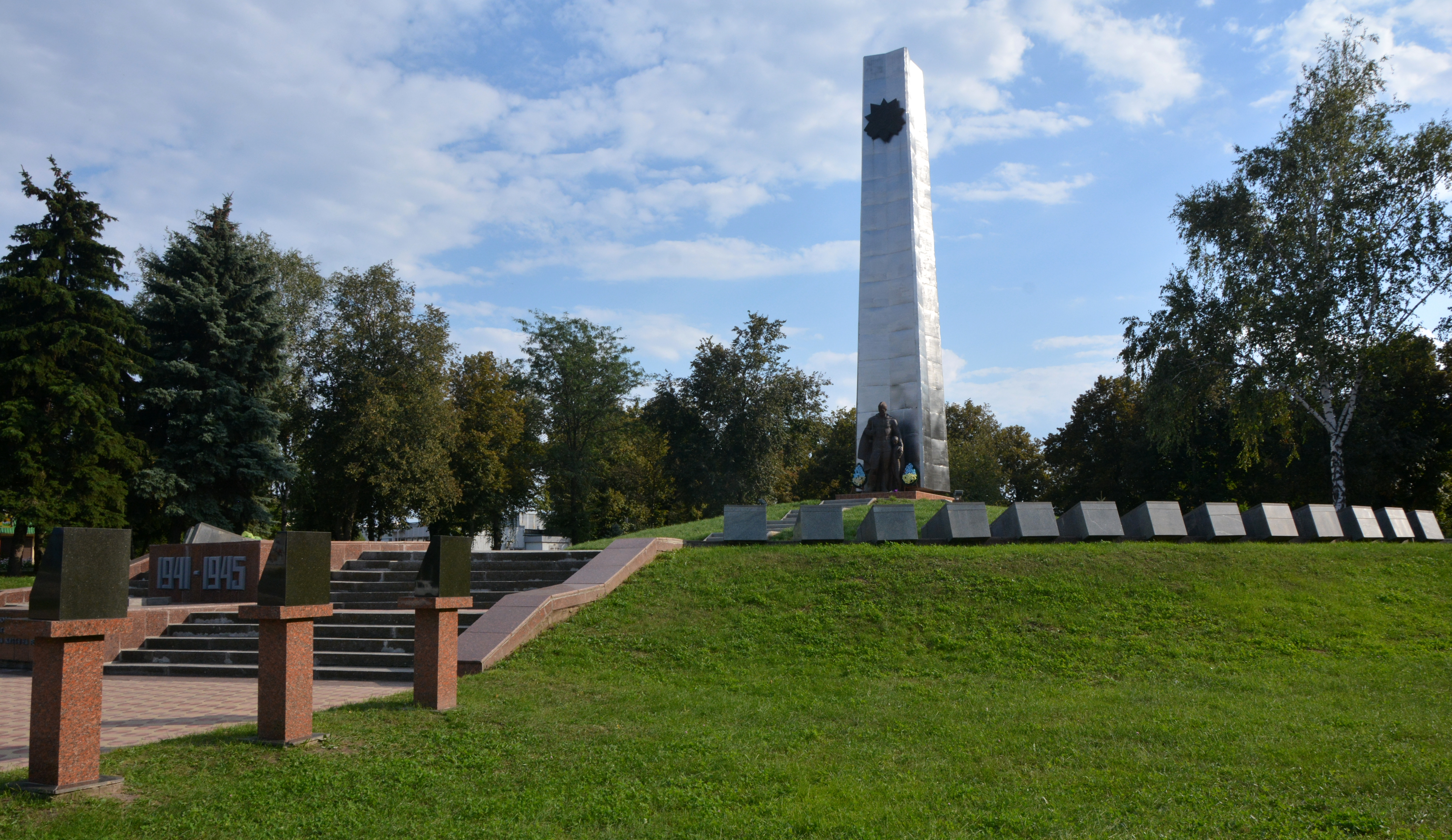
Mass grave of World War II warriors

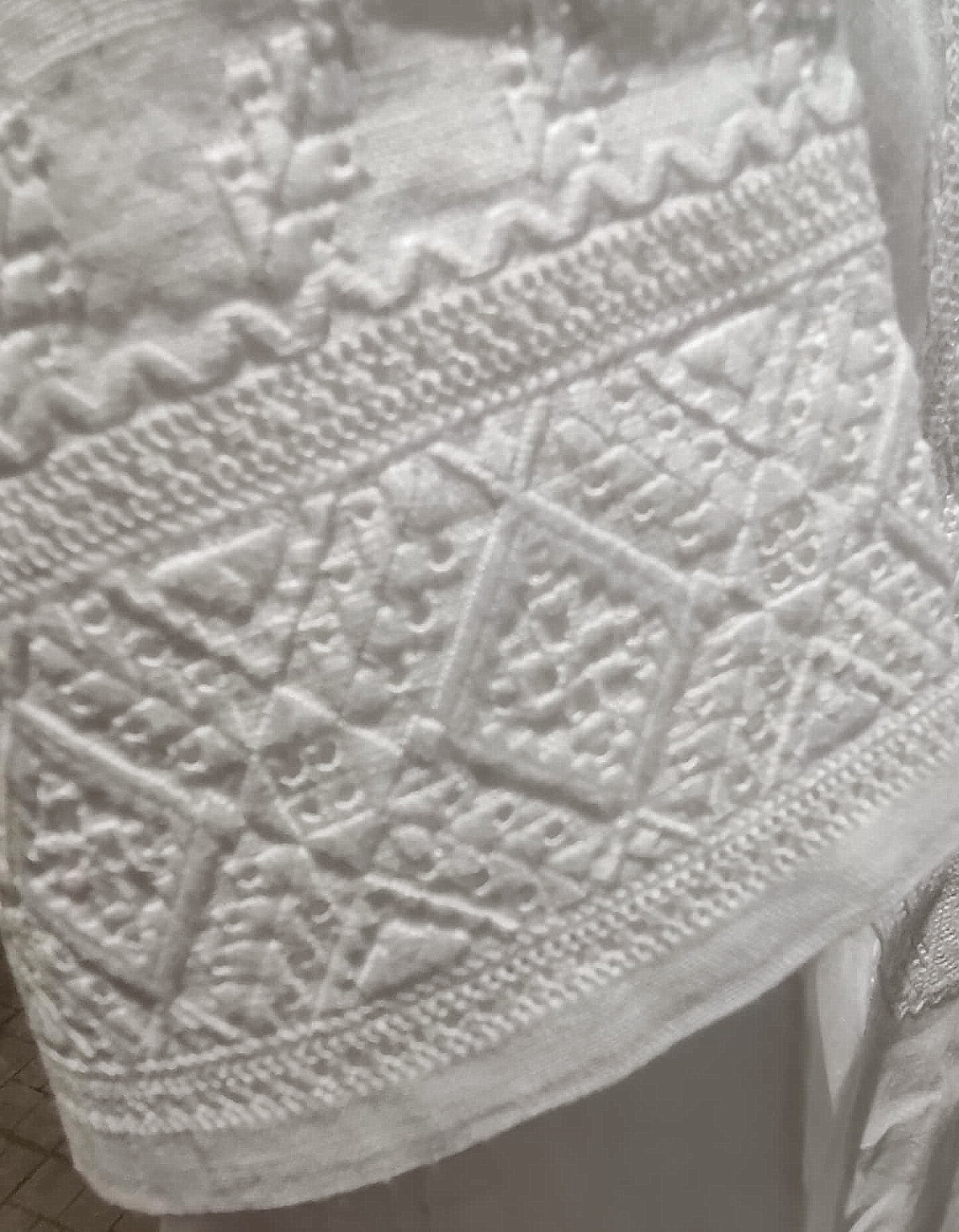
A shirt sleeve with Reshetylivka embroidery
