= Lizhnyk =

Hutsul wool blanket and rug

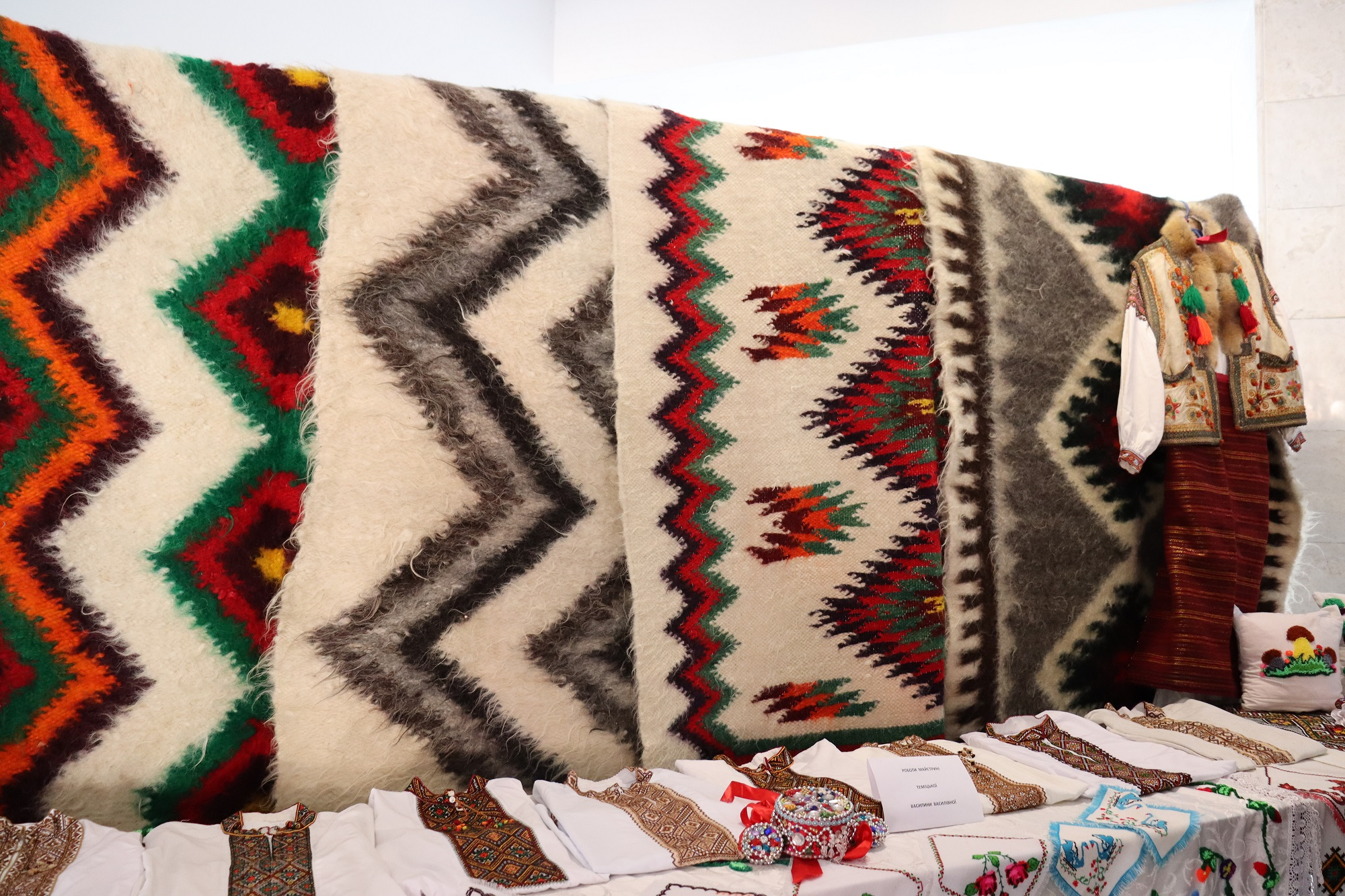
A collection of several different Lizhnyks

A lizhnyk (Ukrainian: Ліжник) or Hutsul blanket is a patterned wool blanket and rug created by Hutsuls, a group indigenous to the Carpathian Mountains of western Ukraine.

Historically, lizhnyks were usually created in shades of grey. With the beginning of the mass production of lizhnyks in the 1920s, various colours and designs have been woven into lizhnyks, particularly during the Soviet period, when competitions were held to select designs for mass-produced lizhnyks. In the present day, a revival of more traditional lizhnyks has occurred. With increased tourism to the Carpathians, the sale of lizhnyks as souvenirs has increased.

In Hutsul culture, lizhnyks are also worn by women, and are claimed to maintain the temperature of a home. They are one of the primary symbols of the Hutsuls, and have been included on the list of Intangible Cultural Heritage of Ukraine since 2020.

Owing to the destruction of several pieces of equipment during the 2008 western Ukrainian floods and low pay, the number of individuals creating lizhnyks has declined despite the product's continued popularity. In an effort to continue lizhnyk traditions, some producers have taken to selling their crafts online.
