= Zozulia (food) =

Traditional Ukrainian dish

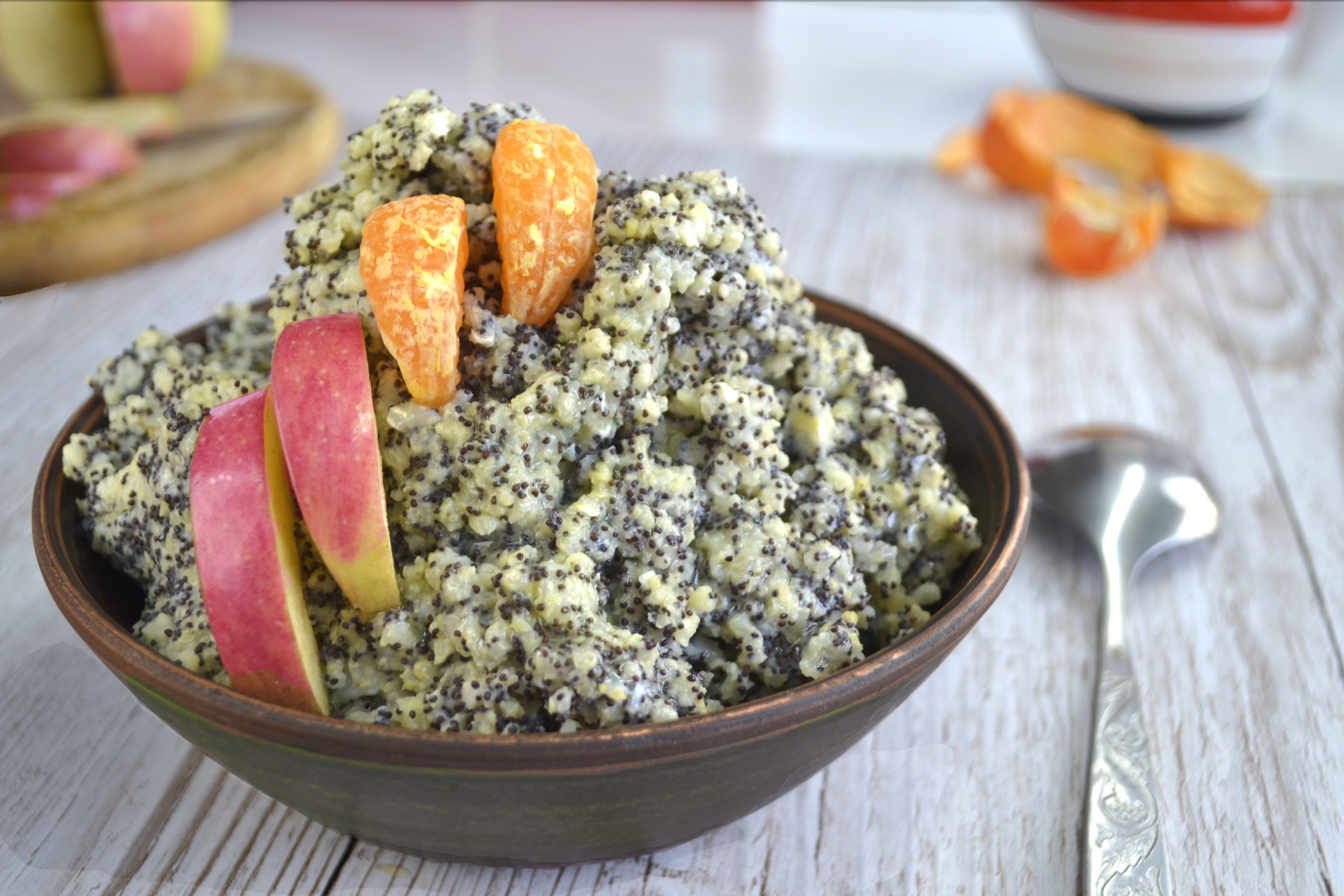
- Place of origin: Ukraine
- Region or state: Vinnytsia Oblast
- Serving temperature: hot
- Main ingredients: millet; poppy seeds, eggs, butter

Zozulia (Ukrainian: зозуля, lit. 'cuckoo bird') is a traditional Ukrainian millet dish. In 2024, the tradition of preparing and eating Zozulia porridge in Vinnytsia Oblast was added to the National List of Intangible Cultural Heritage of Ukraine. Zozulia porridge is traditionally prepared in the village of Dashkivtsi in Vinnytsia Oblast. The hot porridge gets its name from its appearance: it is made from millet and poppy seeds, and is speckled like a cuckoo bird (zozulia).

== Preparation ==
Millet is simmered with milk in the oven, stove, or on the stovetop until half-cooked. Then, shakened up eggs with sugar, poppy seeds, and butter are added to the dish, and the porridge is cooked in the oven or stovetop until done.
