= Yavoriv pie =

Ukrainian pie with potatoes and buckwheat

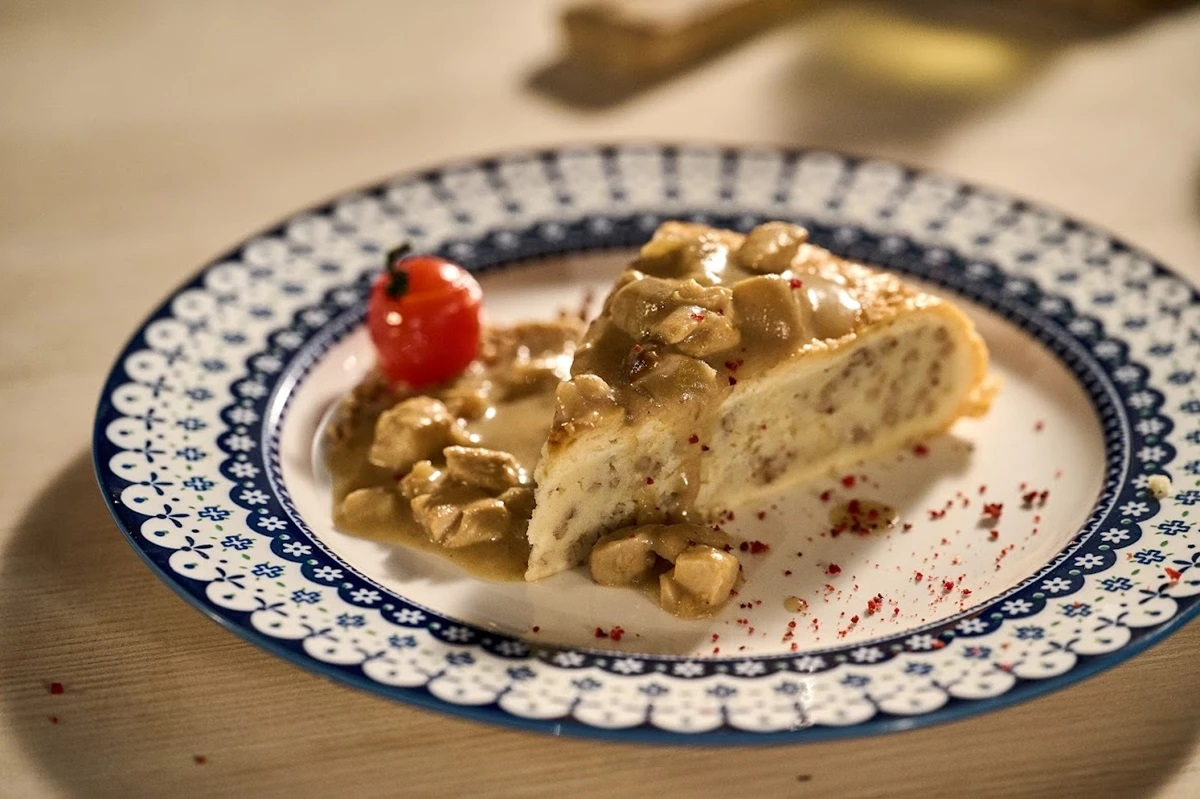
- Baked Yavoriv Pie
- Type: savoury pie
- Place of origin: Ukraine
- Region or state: Galicia (Eastern Europe)
- Serving temperature: hot or cold
- Main ingredients: yeast dough; potatoes, buckwheat

Yavoriv pie (Ukrainian: Яворівський пиріг) is a Ukrainian savoury pie and traditional dish in Yavoriv Raion and Galicia in general, included in the National List of Elements of the Intangible Cultural Heritage of Ukraine. It is widespread in Galicia and sometimes referred to simply as "pyrih".

== History ==
Galicia has a long tradition in baking; in the 16th century, Martin Gruneweg, a traveler and merchant, documented the fame of Lviv and its surroundings for the quality of their pies and baked goods. Buckwheat, the main ingredient in the filling, had been cultivated throughout the region since ancient times and was even called "Tatar grain" (Ukrainian: татарське зерно) by the Galicians.

Historian, co-founder of the Galician Cuisine Club Ihor Lilyo suggests that the pie as it is known today first began to be prepared in Galicia 150 years ago, because potatoes appeared in these lands quite late. "A great importance for the spread of potatoes occurred during the Josephine colonization, when the Austrians resettled a large number of German peasants here. It is not necessary that they invented the pie. Perhaps it was then that potatoes began to dominate more. As for buckwheat, Galicia was called the country of buckwheat. Buckwheat and potatoes led to the simplicity, deliciousness, and all-season nature of the pie", says Ihor Lilyo. Common names for potatoes in the region (mahdeburka and mandyburka) also suggest the vegetable's Germanic origin.

On July 6, 2022, the Ministry of Culture and Informational Policy of Ukraine added 21 items to the National Inventory of Intangible Cultural Heritage (which previously consisted of 26 items), including the tradition of making Yavoriv pie.

=== Popularity ===
Although the pie is named after Yavoriv, it is popular throughout Halychyna. In the former Horodok Raion, for example, it is a staple at wedding banquets. Residents of the Shchyrets area claim the pie was invented there; it is also baked in Zolochiv and Radekhiv. According to Lesya Bilska-Kosyk, director of the Novoiavorivsk Local History Museum, the pie is served at weddings, usually alongside kholodets, as well as at baptisms, birthdays and major religious holidays such as Christmas, Easter and Pentecost. It is common to bake large loaves on Friday to eat it over the weekend, either with borscht or as a standalone dish.

== Preparation ==
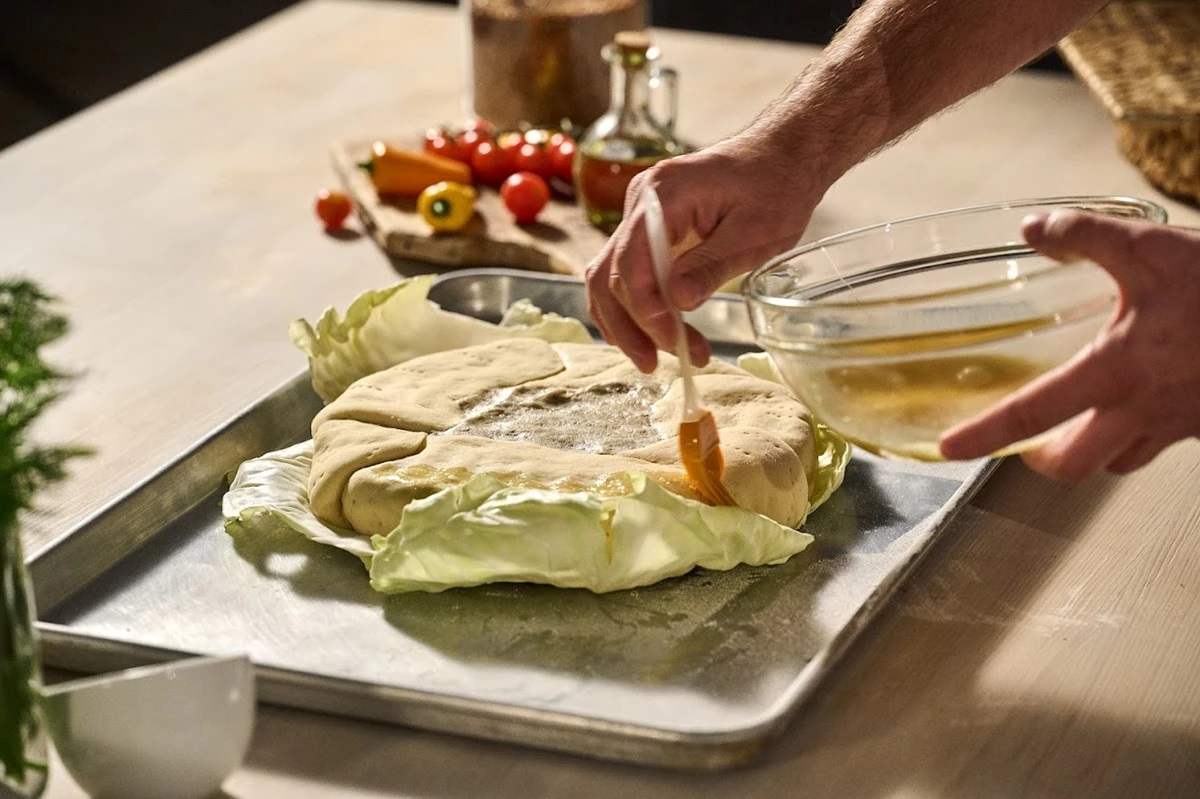
Making Yavoriv pie

The dough is made with flour, yeast, water or milk, egg yolks, olive oil or melted butter, salt, sugar, black pepper and cumin. It must rise well before use; the layer should not be too thick, but thick enough to support the filling, which is quite heavy.

The main ingredients for the filling are boiled and mashed potatoes mixed with cooked or simply blanched buckwheat (in a 1:1 ratio) seasoned with cracklings, onion, salt and black pepper. During fasting periods, only fried onions are used instead of cracklings. The seasoning should be generous as a bland filling compromises the pie's flavor.

The pie can be of different shapes—round, oval, rectangular, depending on the baking dish. In the round version, the filling is placed in the center of a circle of dough, the edges are folded over and sealed and the pie is baked with the seam facing down. In the rectangular version, the dough covers the bottom and sides of the pan, the filling is spread evenly and covered with a second layer of dough. In both cases, the surface is poked with a fork, brushed with egg yolk and sprinkled with coarse salt and cumin. It can be completely covered with dough or partially open. The pie is baked at about 200–210 °C (392–410 °F) for about an hour, until the crust rises and turns golden brown.

=== Serving ===
There are over 10 ways to serve the pie. It is eaten both warm and cold. The fresh dish was mainly served with a machanka (sauce) made from dried porcini mushrooms, if the pie had already stood, it was eaten with borscht on beet kvass or with liquid mushroom soup. The pie could also be fried on both sides in melted butter. It could also be served with a warm sauce made from sour cream and horseradish. Other traditional combinations include kholodets (meat jelly), beets with horseradish and soured milk.

== Polish variant ==
A similar pie is baked in Poland and is called Biłgorajski (Polish: pieróg biłgorajski). It is also based on buckwheat and potatoes, but it is baked without dough and the filling is filled with cheese, sour cream and sometimes cracklings and mint. When Poland attempted to register the Biłgoraj pierogi as an element of UNESCO's list of intangible cultural heritage, the application was rejected by the evaluation committee due to the dish's similarity to the Yavoriv pie and the latter's strong historical association with the region.

== See also ==
- Ukrainian cuisine
