= Kamin-Kashyrskyi urban hromada =

Urban hromada of Volyn Oblast, Ukraine

Kamin-Kashyrskyi urban hromada Камінь-Каширська міська громада
- Hromada
- Seal
- Interactive map of Kamin-Kashyrskyi urban hromada
- Country: Ukraine
- Oblast: Volyn
- Raion: Kamin-Kashyrskyi

Area
  - Total: 1,421.9 km^{2} (549.0 sq mi)

Population (2023)
  - Total: 56,579
  - Density: 39.791/km^{2} (103.06/sq mi)
- CATOTTG code: UA07040010000033507
- Settlements: 3
- Cities: 1
- Villages: 2
- Website: kmk-gromada.gov.ua

Kamin-Kashyrskyi urban territorial hromada (Ukrainian: Камінь-Каширська міська територіальна громада, romanized: Kamin-Kashyrska miska terytorialna hromada) is one of the hromadas of Ukraine, located in Kamin-Kashyrskyi Raion in Volyn Oblast. Its administrative centre is the city of Kamin-Kashyrskyi.

The hromada has an area of 1,421.9 km^{2} (549.0 mi^{2}), as well as a population of 56,579 (as of 2023).

== Composition ==
In addition to one city (Kamin-Kashyrskyi), the hromada contains 54 villages:

- Borovne
- Bronytsia
- Buzaky
- Cherche
- Dobre
- Dubrovytsia
- Farynky
- Horodok
- Hrudky
- Huta-Borovenska
- Huta-Kaminska
- Ivanomysl
- Kalyvytsia
- Khoteshiv
- Klitytsk
- Kotush
- Krasnylivka
- Krymne
- Mala Hlusha
- Mali Holoby
- Malyi Obzyr
- Melnyky-Mostyshche
- Mostyshche
- Nadrichne
- Nevir
- Oleksiivka
- Olenyne
- Olshany
- Osivtsi
- Ostrivok
- Pidborochchia
- Pidrichchia
- Pidtsyria
- Pishchane
- Pnivne
- Pohulianka
- Polytsi
- Rakiv Lis
- Shchytyn
- Sosnivka
- Stobykhva
- Teklyne
- Velyka Hlusha
- Velykyi Obzyr
- Verkhy
- Voiehoshcha
- Volytsia
- Vorokomle
- Vyderta
- Vydrychi
- Vynimok
- Yalovatsk
- Zalazko
- Zhytnivka
