= Wax vinok =

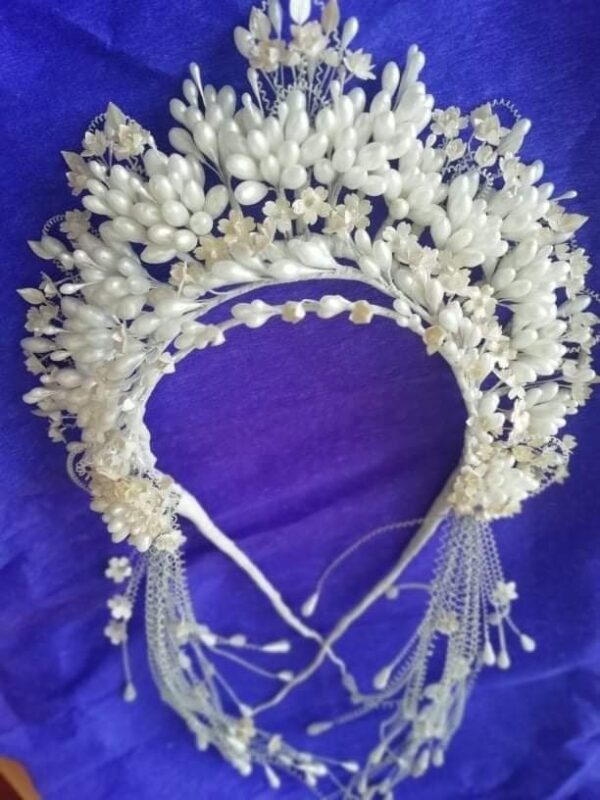
Modern wax vinok

Wax wedding head wreath (or wax vinok; Ukrainian: восковий вінок) is a traditional bride's decoration that was widespread in Vinnytsia Oblast, Ukraine from the end of the 19th century to the end of the 1980s. In 2020, the technology of making "wax" vinok in Vinnytsia region was included in the National Inventory of Intangible Cultural Heritage of Ukraine.

== History ==
At the end of the 19th century and the beginning of the 20th century, the fashion for wax wreaths spread to Ukrainian women through Polish influence. As Polish women were predominantly Roman Catholic—a factor that facilitated the transmission of Western European cultural influences and trends—they had adopted the custom from the West, where wax wreaths remained a common element of bridal attire until the 1980s. Among Poles they were used as part of both bridal and First Communion dress. The making of a wax (or paraffin) wreath with a veil was first started on the territories of modern day Ukraine by Polish peasants in the middle of the 19th century, by the end of the 19th and the beginning of the 20th century, the veil with paraffin wreath spread outside of Polish and mixed Polish-Ukrainian villages, into Ukrainian villages in Eastern Podolia. By the end of the 20th century, wax wreaths practically ceased to be used.

== Technology ==
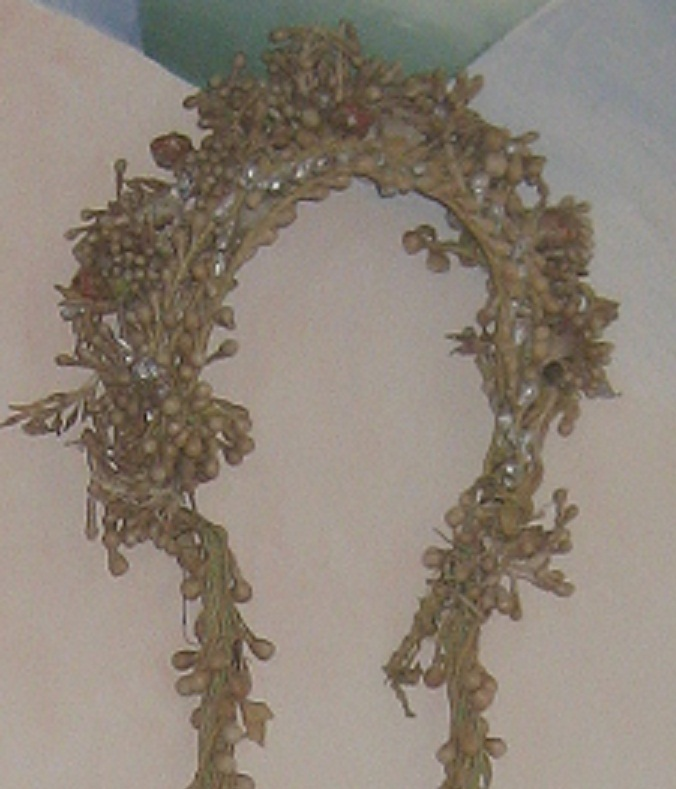
Wax vinok in a museum

Paper, paraffin, wire, candy wrappers, foil, glass beads and wood shavings were used for creating the wreaths. Flowers and leaves were made of paper and then waxed. To make bubble or icicle-shaped decorations, paraffin (or a mixture prepared by the craftsman) is placed in a metal container and melted. The tip of the wrapped wire is bent into a loop (some craftsmen use a straight section), alternately immersed in melted paraffin and then in clean water until a paraffin drop forms at the end of the base. The basis of the wreath is a piece of rough wire wrapped in paper or floral tape that is bent it in the shape of an arc. Flowers, leaves, wax flowers or bunches of wax flowers are wound alternately on the arc in the appropriate or desired order. Often, berizky or batizhky hang from the sides of the wreath along the chest. Wreaths were made two-, three-, or four-tiered – the higher, the richer. Decorations were mainly made by local craftsmen that could be found in every village or town.

== Sources ==
- Лілія Іваневич. Традиційний одяг українців Поділля (друга половина ХІХ – початок ХХІ ст.): історія, класифікація, конструктивно-художні та регіонально-локальні особливості. Монографія. Хмельницький, 2022. 800 с.
