= Örnek (ornament) =

Crimean Tatar ornament

Ornek, a Crimean Tatar ornament and knowledge about it
- UNESCO Intangible Cultural Heritage
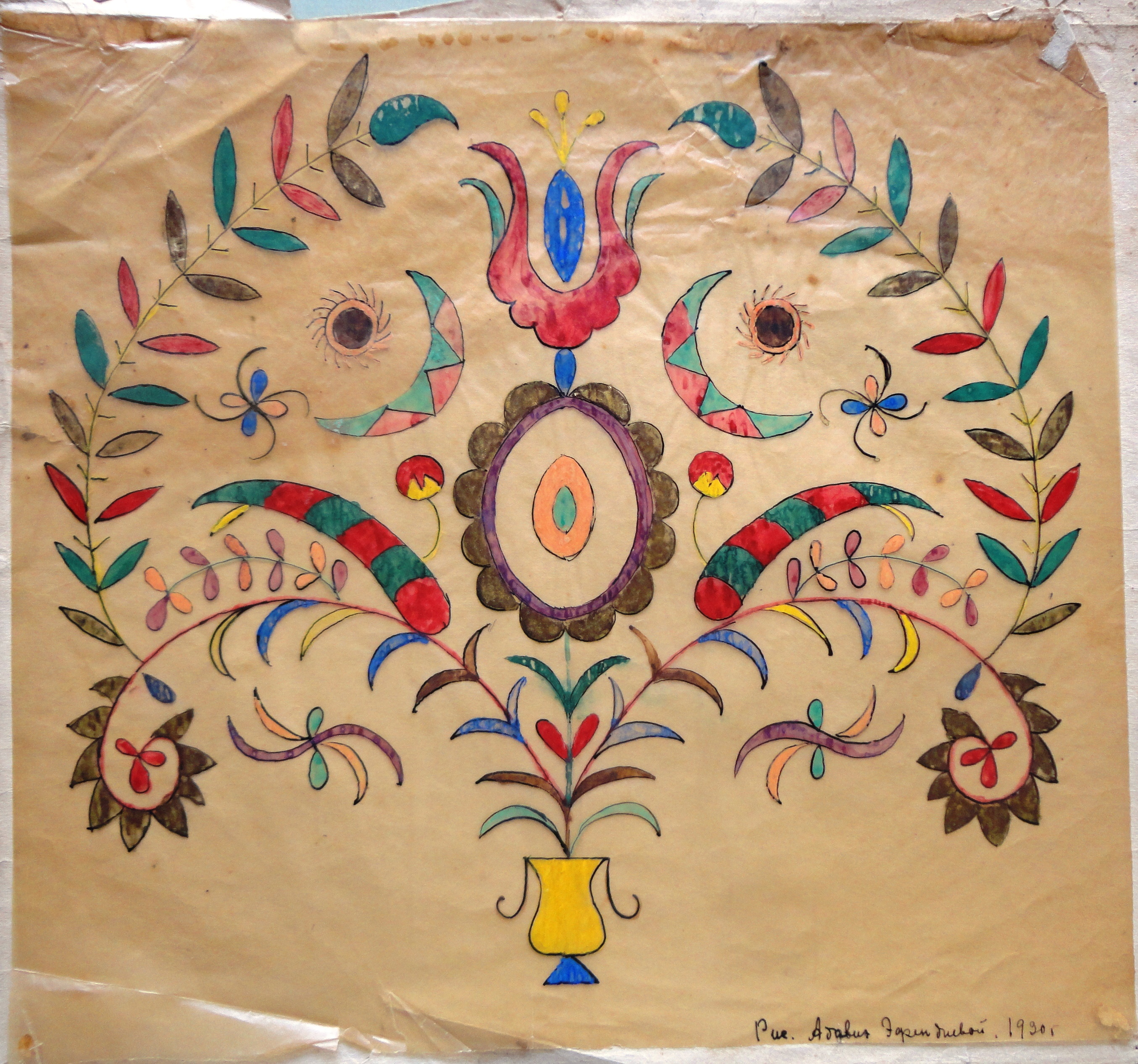
- Country: Ukraine
- Reference: 01601
- Region: Europe and North America

Inscription history
- Inscription: 2021 (16th session)
- List: Representative

Örnek is a national Crimean Tatar ornament and one of the oldest cultural achievements of the Crimean Tatars. In 2021, Örnek and its knowledge was inscribed in the UNESCO Intangible Cultural Heritage Lists.

== Description ==
The Örnek contains small elements combined into a composition, mainly of a plant and geometric nature, symmetrically and asymmetrically arranged. The main symbolism is the image of flowers and trees in shades of pink, green, yellow and blue. The ornament is used as an element of the decor of national clothes, shoes, headdresses, as well as in jewelry, on ceramic and metal dishes, wooden products, household appliances, in furniture decoration, carpets.

== Recognition ==
In February 2018, the Örnek was inscribed in the National List of Intangible Cultural Heritage of Ukraine.

The ornament, as an element of the intangible cultural heritage (Intangible Cultural Heritage) of Ukraine, was included in the preliminary list of UNESCO for its possible inclusion in the representative list of the intangible cultural heritage of mankind. On 16 December 2021, the Örnek was officially included in the UNESCO cultural heritage. The nomination of "Ornek - Crimean Tatar ornament" was a long-term initiative of the Crimean Tatar public organization "Alem".
