= Pnivne =

Village in Volyn Oblast, Ukraine

Coordinates: 51°41′N 25°16′E

Pnivne (Ukrainian: Пнівне) is a village in the Kamin-Kashyrskyi Raion (district) of Volyn Oblast (province) of western Ukraine. It has a population of 583 persons.
