= Reshetylivka Raion =

Former subdivision of Poltava Oblast, Ukraine

Reshetylivka Raion Решетилівський район
- Raion
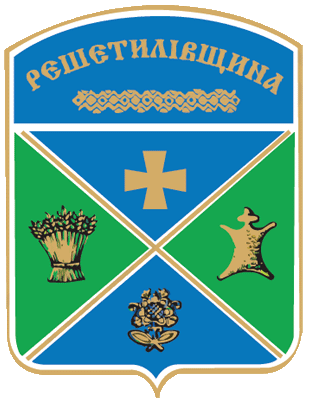
- Flag Coat of arms

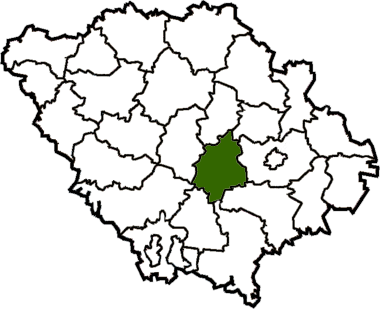
- Coordinates: 49°33′57.1248″N 34°3′1.98″E
- Country: Ukraine
- Oblast: Poltava Oblast
- Established: 7 March 1923
- Disestablished: 18 July 2020
- Admin. center: Reshetylivka
- Subdivisions: List: — city councils; — settlement councils; — rural councils; Number of localities: — cities; — urban-type settlements; 81 — villages; — rural settlements

Government
  - Governor: Volodymyr Kolesnichenko

Area
  - Total: 1,009 km^{2} (390 sq mi)

Population (2020)
  - Total: 25,336
  - Density: 25.11/km^{2} (65.03/sq mi)
- Time zone: UTC+02:00 (EET)
  - Summer (DST): UTC+03:00 (EEST)
- Postal index: 38400—38452
- Area code: +380-5363
- Website: Official homepage

Reshetylivka Raion (Ukrainian: Решетилівський район) was a raion (district) in Poltava Oblast of central Ukraine of Poltava. The raion's administrative center was the city (urban-type settlement before 2017) of Reshetylivka. The raion was abolished and its territory was merged into Poltava Raion on 18 July 2020 as part of the administrative reform of Ukraine, which reduced the number of raions of Poltava Oblast to four. The last estimate of the raion population was 25,336 (2020 est.)
