= Buckwheat (disambiguation) =

Buckwheat (Fagopyrum esculentum) is a plant cultivated for its grain-like seeds; it is also used as a cover crop.

Buckwheat may also refer to:

== Plants ==
- Buckwheat family or Polygonaceae, a family of plants
- Tartary buckwheat or Fagopyrum tataricum, cultivated in the Himalayas
- Tall buckwheat, Fagopyrum acutatum, synonym Fagopyrum dibotrys, cultivated for medicinal use and as animal fodder
- Eriogonum or wild buckwheat, a genus of North American plants
- Fallopia convolvulus or wild buckwheat, a noxious agricultural weed.

== Entertainment ==
- Buckwheat, a character played by Billie Thomas in the 1930s U.S. short film series Our Gang
  - Portrayed as an adult by comedian Eddie Murphy on Saturday Night Live
- Buckwheat Zydeco (1947–2016), American accordionist and zydeco musician

== See also ==
- Buckweed
