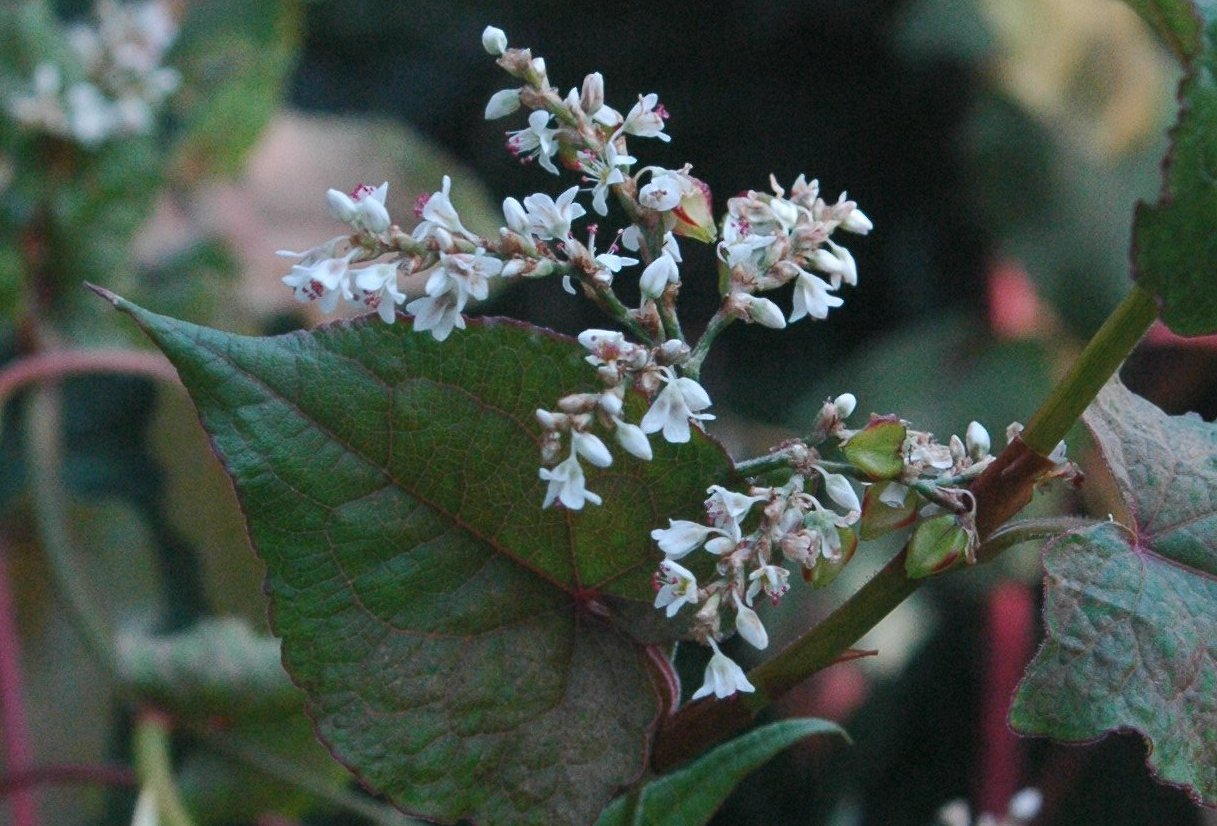

Scientific classification
- Kingdom: Plantae
- Clade: Embryophytes
- Clade: Tracheophytes
- Clade: Angiosperms
- Clade: Eudicots
- Order: Caryophyllales
- Family: Polygonaceae
- Genus: Fagopyrum
- Species: F. cymosum

Binomial name
- Fagopyrum cymosum (Trevir.) Meisn.

Synonyms
- Coccoloba cymosa Lour.; Fagopyrum acutatum Mansf. ex K.Hammer; Fagopyrum chinense Raf.; Fagopyrum dibotrys (D.Don) H.Hara; Fagopyrum megaspartanium Q.F.Chen; Fagopyrum pilus Q.F.Chen; Fagopyrum triangulare Meisn. ex Wall.; Fagopyrum tristachyum (H.Lév.) Gross; Helxine acutata Kuntze; Oxygonum tristachyum (Baker) H.Perrier; Polygonum acutatum Lehm.; Polygonum cymosum Trevir.; Polygonum dibotrys D.Don; Polygonum labordei H.Lév. & Vaniot; Polygonum tristachyum Baker; Polygonum tristachyum H.Lév.

= Fagopyrum cymosum =

Species of grass

Fagopyrum cymosum, also known as perennial buckwheat' or tall buckwheat, is a domesticated plant used in traditional Chinese medicine, for animal feed, and as an ornamental plant. It is native to much of China, and to Bhutan, Nepal, India, Burma, and Vietnam.

== Chemistry ==
The flowers are known for their high content of fagopyrin, a naphthodianthrone that provokes phototoxic effects known as fagopyrism.

== See also ==
- シャクチリソバ
