= 2-Hydroxybenzylamine =

Chemical compound

2-HOBA
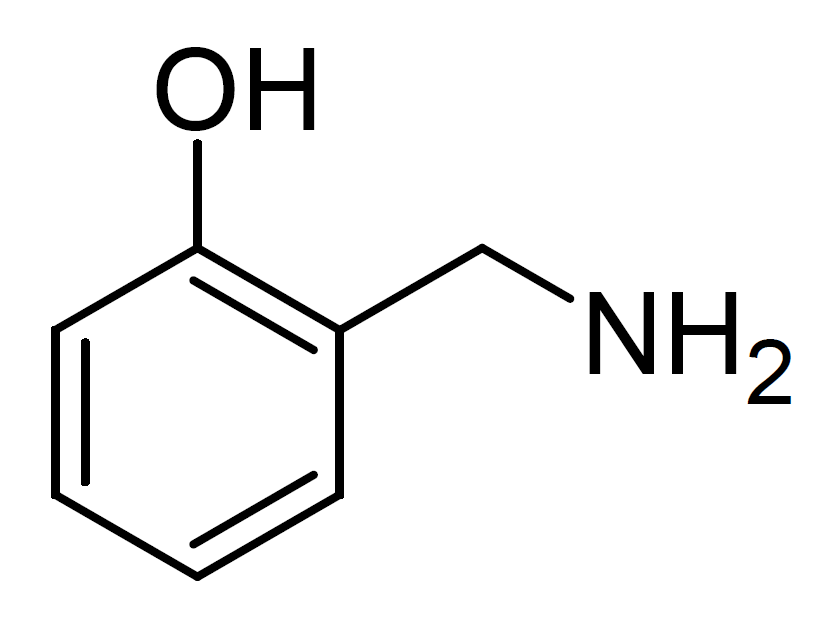

Identifiers
- IUPAC name: 2-(aminomethyl)phenol
- CAS Number: 932-30-9
- PubChem CID: 70267
- DrugBank: DB14855
- ChemSpider: 63452
- UNII: 696R5N4NRM
- ChEMBL: ChEMBL155572
- ECHA InfoCard: 100.012.045

Chemical and physical data
- Formula: C_{7}H_{9}NO
- Molar mass: 123.155 g·mol^{−1}
- 3D model (JSmol): Interactive image
- SMILES: C1=CC=C(C(=C1)CN)O
- InChI: InChI=1S/C7H9NO/c8-5-6-3-1-2-4-7(6)9/h1-4,9H,5,8H2; Key:KPRZOPQOBJRYSW-UHFFFAOYSA-N

2-Hydroxybenzylamine (2-HOBA, marketed as Hobamine) is a natural product found in Himalayan tartary buckwheat (Fagopyrum tataricum). It acts as an antioxidant and is thus sold as a dietary supplement.
