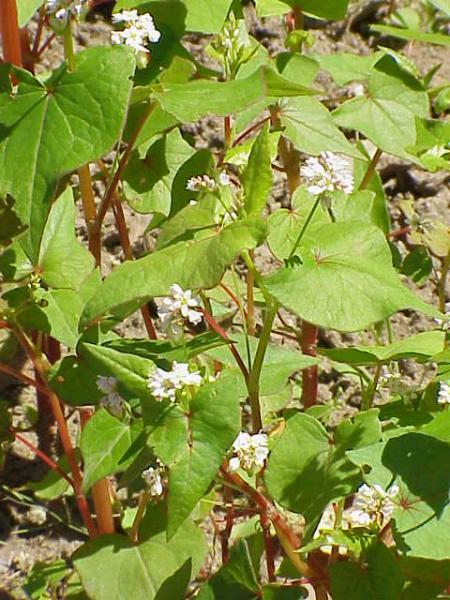
- Fagopyrum esculentum

Scientific classification
- Kingdom: Plantae
- Clade: Tracheophytes
- Clade: Angiosperms
- Clade: Eudicots
- Order: Caryophyllales
- Family: Polygonaceae
- Subfamily: Polygonoideae
- Genus: Fagopyrum; Mill.

Species
- See text

Synonyms
- Fagotriticum L.; Harpagocarpus Hutch. & Dandy; Helxine L.; Kunokale Raf.; Parapteropyrum A.J.Li; Phegopyrum Peterm.; Trachopyron J.Gerard ex Raf.

= Fagopyrum =

Genus of flowering plants

The genus Fagopyrum is in the flowering plant family Polygonaceae. It includes some important food plants, such as F. esculentum (buckwheat) and F. tataricum (Tartary buckwheat). The genus is native to the Indian subcontinent, much of Indochina, central and southeastern China, and central and eastern tropical Africa. Species have been widely introduced elsewhere, throughout the Holarctic and parts of Africa and South America.

== Description ==
Fagopyrum contains 30 species of plants, including two important crop plants, buckwheat (Fagopyrum esculentum), and Fagopyrum tataricum (Tartary buckwheat). The two have similar uses, and are classed as pseudocereals, because they are used in the same way as cereals but do not belong to the grass family Poaceae.

Within Fagopyrum, the cultivated species are in the Cymosum group, including Fagopyrum cymosum or perennial buckwheat, the artificial hybrid Fagopyrum × giganteum, and Fagopyrum homotropicum.

This genus has five-petaled flowers arranged in a compound raceme that produces laterally flowered cymose clusters.

== Taxonomy ==
The genus Fagopyrum was first published by Philip Miller in 1754. It is placed in the tribe Fagopyreae (as the only genus) in the subfamily Polygonoideae.

=== Species ===
As of October 2025, Plants of the World Online accepted the following species:

- Fagopyrum callianthum Ohnishi
- Fagopyrum capillatum Ohnishi
- Fagopyrum caudatum (Sam.) A.J.Li
- Fagopyrum crispatifolium J.L.Liu
- Fagopyrum cymosum (Trevir.) Meisn.
- Fagopyrum densivillosum J.L.Liu
- Fagopyrum esculentum Moench
- Fagopyrum gilesii (Hemsl.) Hedberg
- Fagopyrum gracilipedoides Ohsako & Ohnishi
- Fagopyrum gracilipes (Hemsl.) Dammer
- Fagopyrum homotropicum Ohnishi
- Fagopyrum jinshaense Ohsako & Ohnishi
- Fagopyrum kashmirianum Munshi
- Fagopyrum leptopodum (Diels) Hedberg
- Fagopyrum lineare (Sam.) Haraldson
- Fagopyrum longistylum M.L.Zhou & T.Yu
- Fagopyrum longzhoushanense J.R.Shao
- Fagopyrum luojishanense J.R.Shao
- Fagopyrum macrocarpum Ohsako & Ohnishi
- Fagopyrum pleioramosum Ohnishi
- Fagopyrum pugense T.Yu
- Fagopyrum qiangcai D.Q.Bai
- Fagopyrum rubrifolium Ohsako & Ohnishi
- Fagopyrum snowdenii (Hutch. & Dandy) S.P.Hong
- Fagopyrum statice (H.Lév.) Gross
- Fagopyrum tataricum (L.) Gaertn.
- Fagopyrum tibeticum (A.J.Li) Adr.Sanchez & Jan.M.Burke
- Fagopyrum urophyllum (Bureau & Franch.) Gross
- Fagopyrum wenchuanense J.R.Shao
- Fagopyrum zuogongense Q.F.Chen

== See also ==
- List of edible seeds
