= Fagopyrum tibeticum =

Scientific classification
- Kingdom: Plantae
- Clade: Tracheophytes
- Clade: Angiosperms
- Clade: Eudicots
- Order: Caryophyllales
- Family: Polygonaceae
- Genus: Fagopyrum
- Species: F. tibeticum

Binomial name
- Fagopyrum tibeticum (A.J.Li) Adr.Sanchez & Jan.M.Burke

Synonyms
- Parapteropyrum tibeticum A.J.Li

Species of flowering plant

Fagopyrum tibeticum is a species of flowering plants in the family Polygonaceae endemic to Tibet. It was formerly placed in the monotypic genus Parapteropyrum.
