= Hrechanyky =

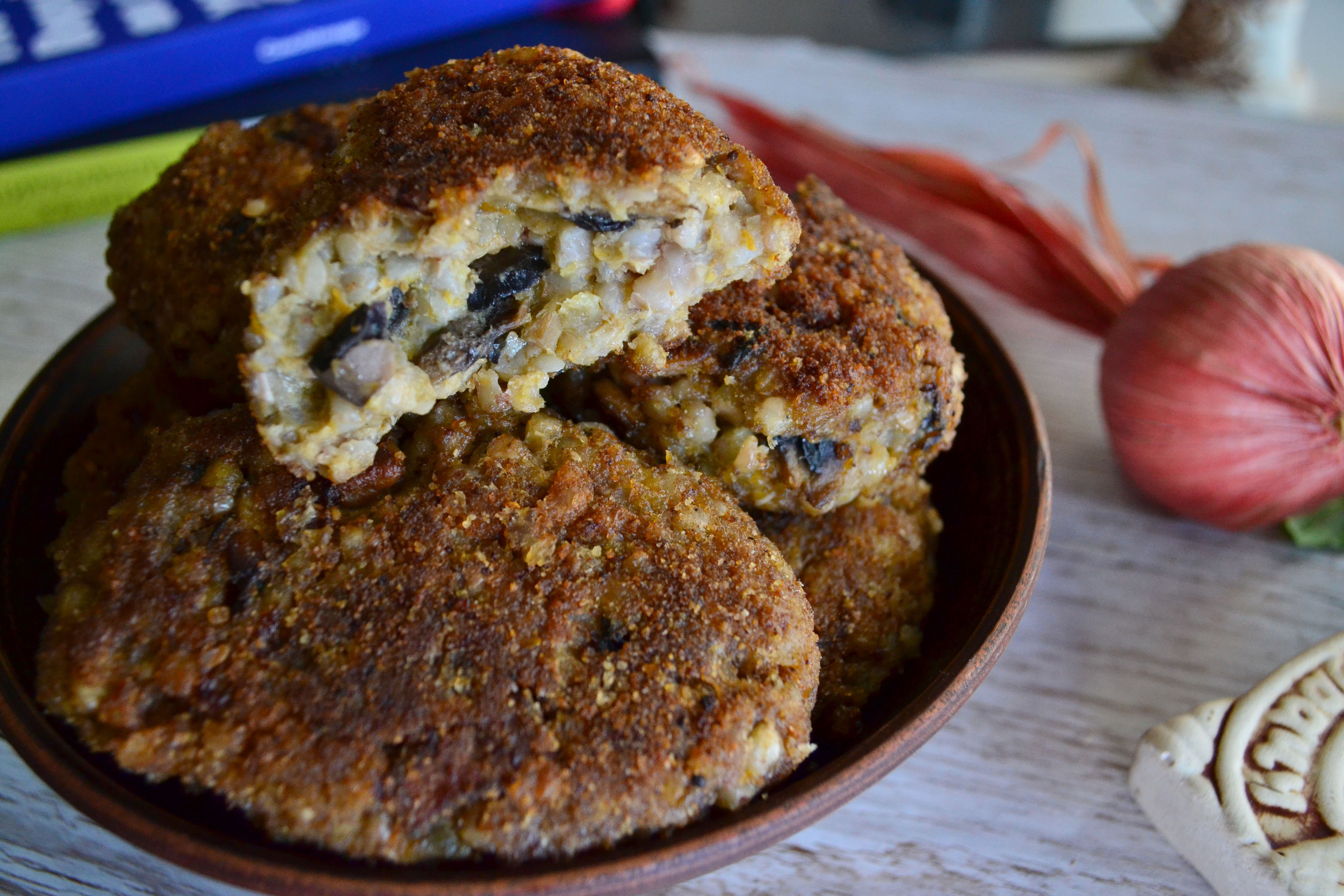
Hrechanyky with mushrooms

Hrechanyky (Ukrainian: Гречаники) or hrechaniks is a Ukrainian dish of boiled buckwheat grains and minced meat, mixed together and formed into a shape similar to meatballs. Other ingredients include onions, eggs, carrot, garlic, flour and tomato paste.

Hrechanyky can be served as a main course or side dish. Various types of meat can be used in cooking the dish. It is usually served with tomato or garlic sauce and accompanied with salad.

In Ukrainian tradition, hrechanyky with horseradish were commonly eaten during Lent.

Hrechanyky is also the name of a traditional Ukrainian dance from Central Ukraine.
