= Fagopyrum snowdenii =

Scientific classification
- Kingdom: Plantae
- Clade: Tracheophytes
- Clade: Angiosperms
- Clade: Eudicots
- Order: Caryophyllales
- Family: Polygonaceae
- Genus: Fagopyrum
- Species: F. snowdenii

Binomial name
- Fagopyrum snowdenii (Hutch. & Dandy) S.P.Hong

Synonyms
- Harpagocarpus snowdenii Hutch. & Dandy (1926) (basionym); Fagopyrum ciliatum Jacq.-Fél.

Genus of flowering plants

Fagopyrum snowdenii is a species of flowering plants belonging to the family Polygonaceae. It is a climbing subshrub native to central and eastern tropical Africa, ranging from Cameroon to Sudan and Tanzania.

The species was first described in 1926 by John Hutchinson and James Edgar Dandy in 1926, and placed in the newly-described monotypic genus Harpagocarpus as Harpagocarpus snowdenii. In 1988 Suk Pyo Hong placed it in the genus Fagopyrum as Fagopyrum snowdenii.
