= Fagopyrin =

Family of organic compounds found in buckwheat

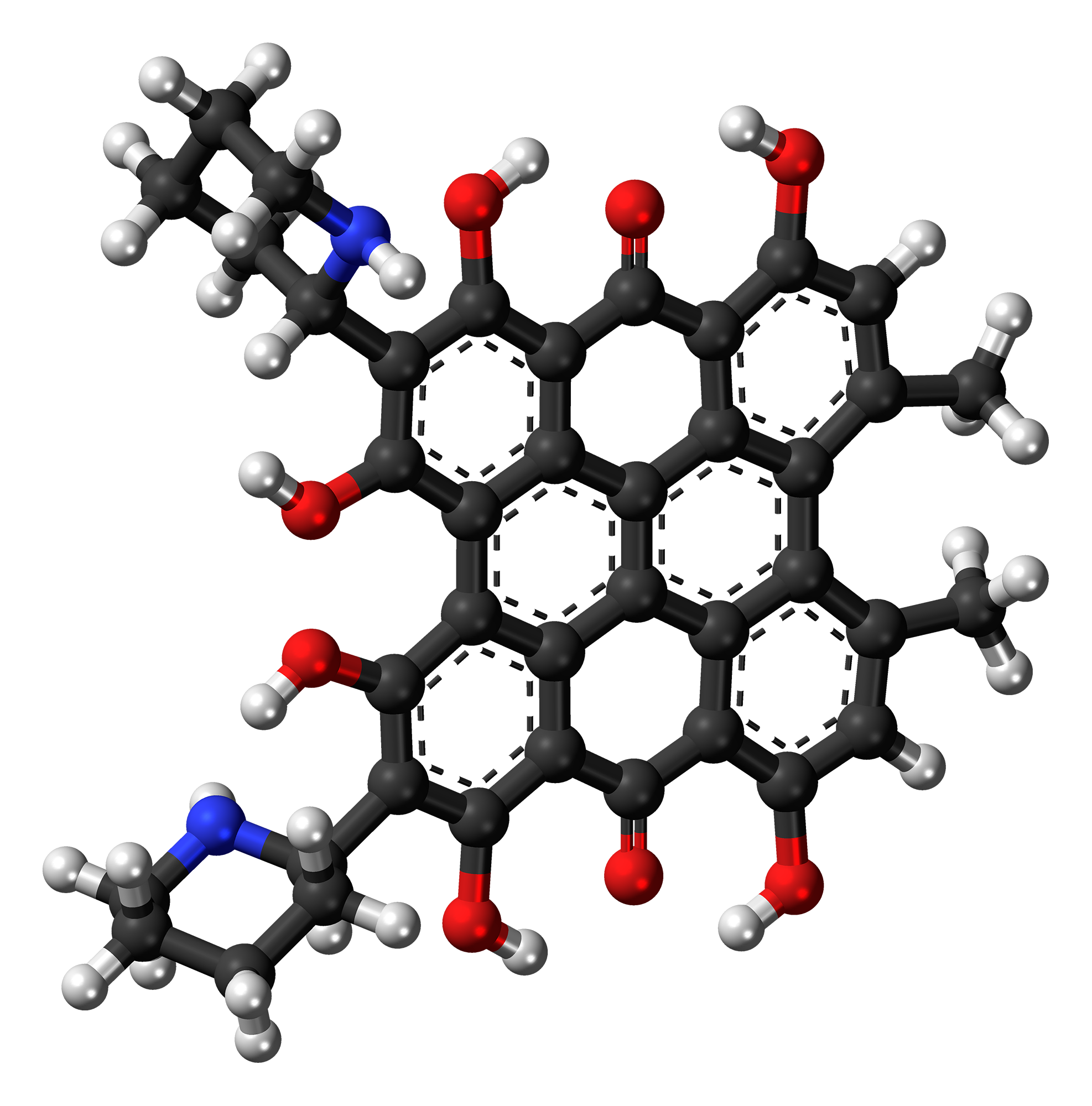

Names
- IUPAC name 1,3,4,6,8,13-Hexahydroxy-10,11-dimethyl-2,5-di(piperidin-2-yl)fenantro[1,10,9,8-opqra]peryleen-7,14-dion

Identifiers
CAS Number	72393-03-4
3D model (JSmol)	Interactive image
ChemSpider	4589856
PubChem CID	5488537
CompTox Dashboard (EPA)	DTXSID40993184
- InChI: InChI=1S/C40H34N2O8/c1-13-11-17(43)23-25-19(13)20-14(2)12-18(44)24-26(20)28-27(25)29-31(35(45)21(15-7-3-5-9-41-15)37(47)33(29)39(23)49)32-30(28)34(40(24)50)38(48)22(36(32)46)16-8-4-6-10-42-16/h11-12,15-16,41-48H,3-10H2,1-2H3 Key: ROFJUMITFMRBRF-UHFFFAOYSA-N
- SMILES: O=C1C2=C(C3=C(O)C(C4CCCCN4)=C2O)C(C5=C6C(C)=CC(O)=C15)=C7C(C3=C(O)C(C8NCCCC8)=C9O)=C9C(C%10=C7C6=C(C)C=C%10O)=O

Properties
Chemical formula	C_{40}H_{34}N_{2}O_{8}
Molar mass	670.718 g·mol^{−1}
Appearance	Red pigment
- Except where otherwise noted, data are given for materials in their standard state (at 25 °C [77 °F], 100 kPa). verify (what is ?) Infobox references

Fagopyrin is a phototoxic substance found in the flowers of buckwheat (Fagopyrum esculentum). Their chemical structure contains a naphthodianthrone skeleton similar to that of hypericin. After ingestion, fagopyrin can cause sensitivity to light, also called fagopyrism, an itchy skin rash.

== History and occurrence ==
The substance was isolated from flowers of the red-flowering genotype of buckwheat in 1941, and its chemical structure, which is derived from hypericin, was first described in 1979. Within the edible parts of the plant, it is found exclusively in the brown fruit husk of buckwheat grains.

Fagopyrin is located almost exclusively in the cotyledons of the buckwheat herb.

== Structure ==
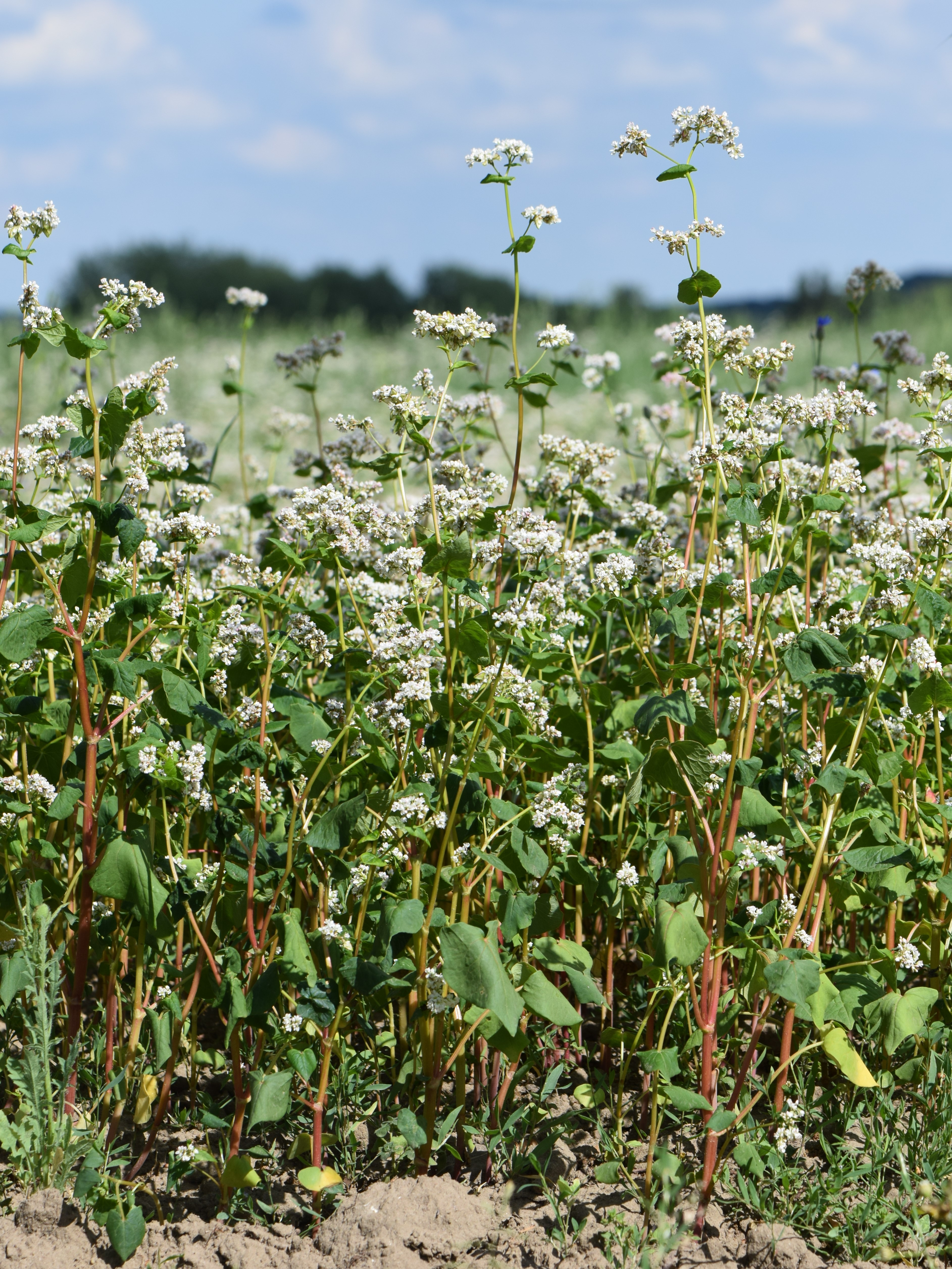
True buckwheat

Recent literature describes several variants of fagopyrin, referred to as fagopyrins A to F. They differ in methylation at positions C-10 and C-11 and contain piperidineyl or pyrrolidineyl residues at C-2 and C-5.

== Biosynthesis and properties ==
The biosynthetic precursor of fagopyrin is protofagopyrin. This proto-compound converts under the influence of light by cyclization into fagopyrin, which is lipophilic and cannot be extracted with water. The content of fagopyrin in tea preparations is generally below the detection limit (<0.01%).

A solution of fagopyrin in pyridine exhibits a red color.
