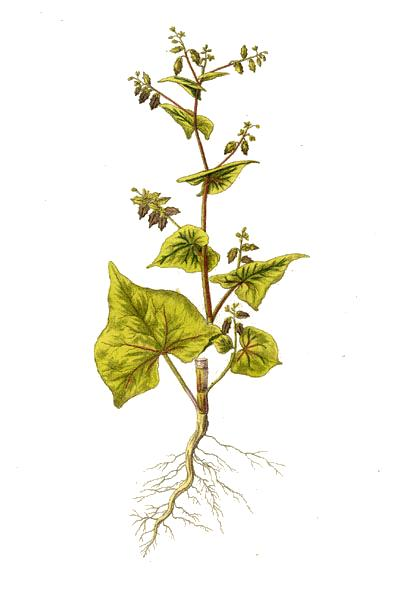

Scientific classification
- Kingdom: Plantae
- Clade: Tracheophytes
- Clade: Angiosperms
- Clade: Eudicots
- Order: Caryophyllales
- Family: Polygonaceae
- Genus: Fagopyrum
- Species: F. tataricum

Binomial name
- Fagopyrum tataricum (L.) Gaertn.

Synonyms
- Fagopyrum dentatum Moench; Fagopyrum rotundatum Bab.; Fagopyrum subdentatum Gilib.; Fagopyrum suffruticosum F.Schmidt; Polygonum tataricum L.

= Fagopyrum tataricum =

Species of plant

Fagopyrum tataricum, also known as Tartary buckwheat, green buckwheat, ku qiao, Tatar buckwheat, or bitter buckwheat, is a domesticated food plant in the genus Fagopyrum in the family Polygonaceae. With another species in the same genus, common buckwheat, it is often counted as a cereal, but the buckwheats are not closely related to true cereals.

Tartary buckwheat is more bitter and contains more rutin than common buckwheat. It also contains other bioactive components such as flavonoids, phenolic acids, 2-hydroxybenzylamine and quercitrin.

== Uses ==
Known in Chinese as "bitter buckwheat" (Chinese: 苦荞麦; pinyin: kǔqiáomài) and in Japan as dattan-soba (韃靼蕎麦/ダッタンソバ; 'Tartary buckwheat'), the plant was domesticated as a crop in East Asia and is also being cultivated in Europe and North America. While it is an unfamiliar food in the West, it is common in the Himalayan region today, as well as other regions in Southwest China such as Sichuan province. Tartary buckwheat is commonly roasted to make buckwheat tea, and it can also be distilled to make alcohol. While not traditionally eaten in Japan, due to its high rutin content it was briefly popular as a health fad in Japan in the late 1990s.

The plant has been cultivated in many parts of the world; however, when found among other crops it is considered a weed. Less bitter varieties are now commercially available.

== Chemistry ==
Fagopyrum tataricum contains aromatic substances. The most important difference when compared to the aroma of Fagopyrum esculentum is the absence of salicylaldehyde and presence of naphthalene.

== Gallery ==
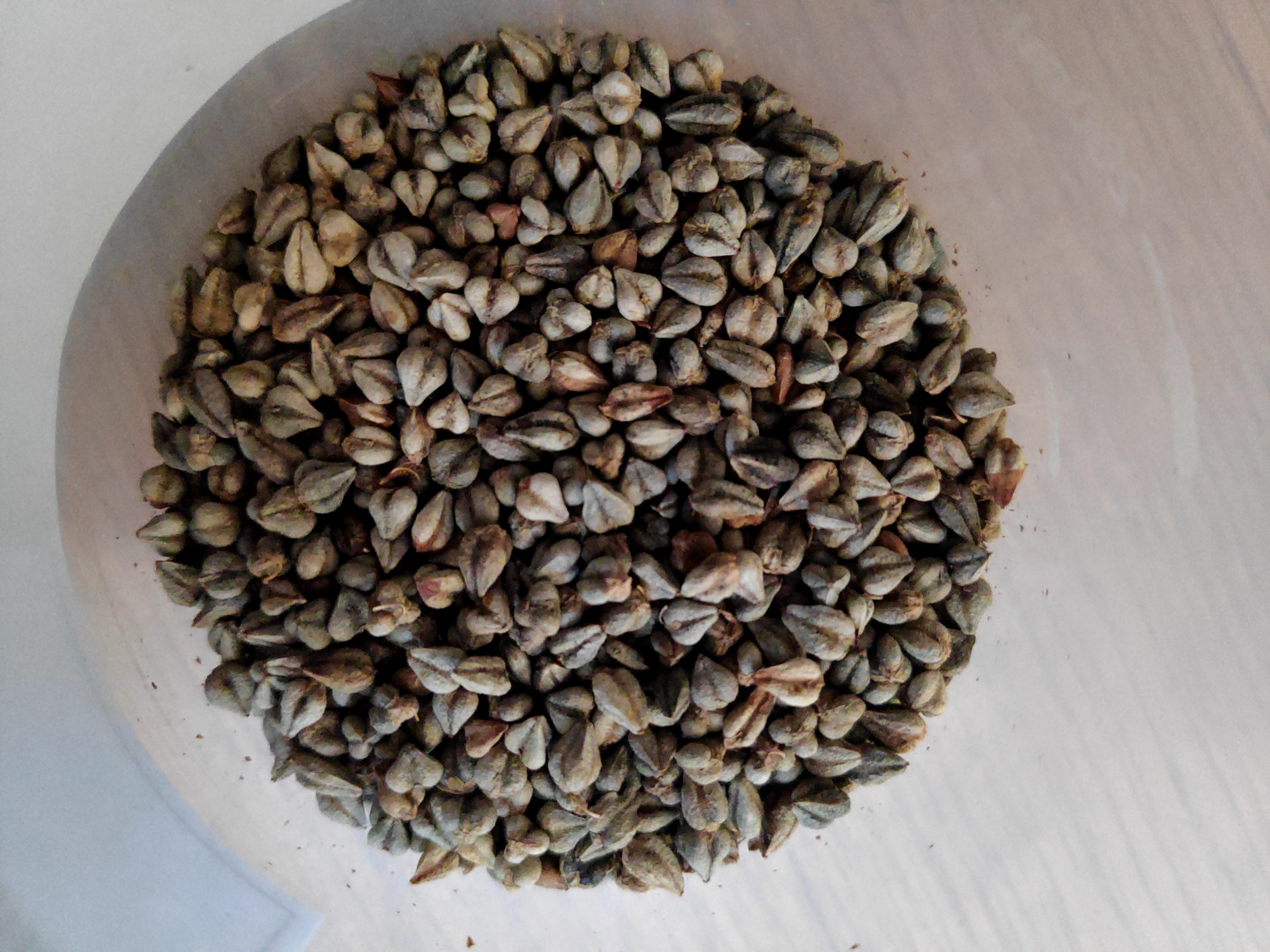
Fagopyrum tataricum seeds from Mustang, Nepal

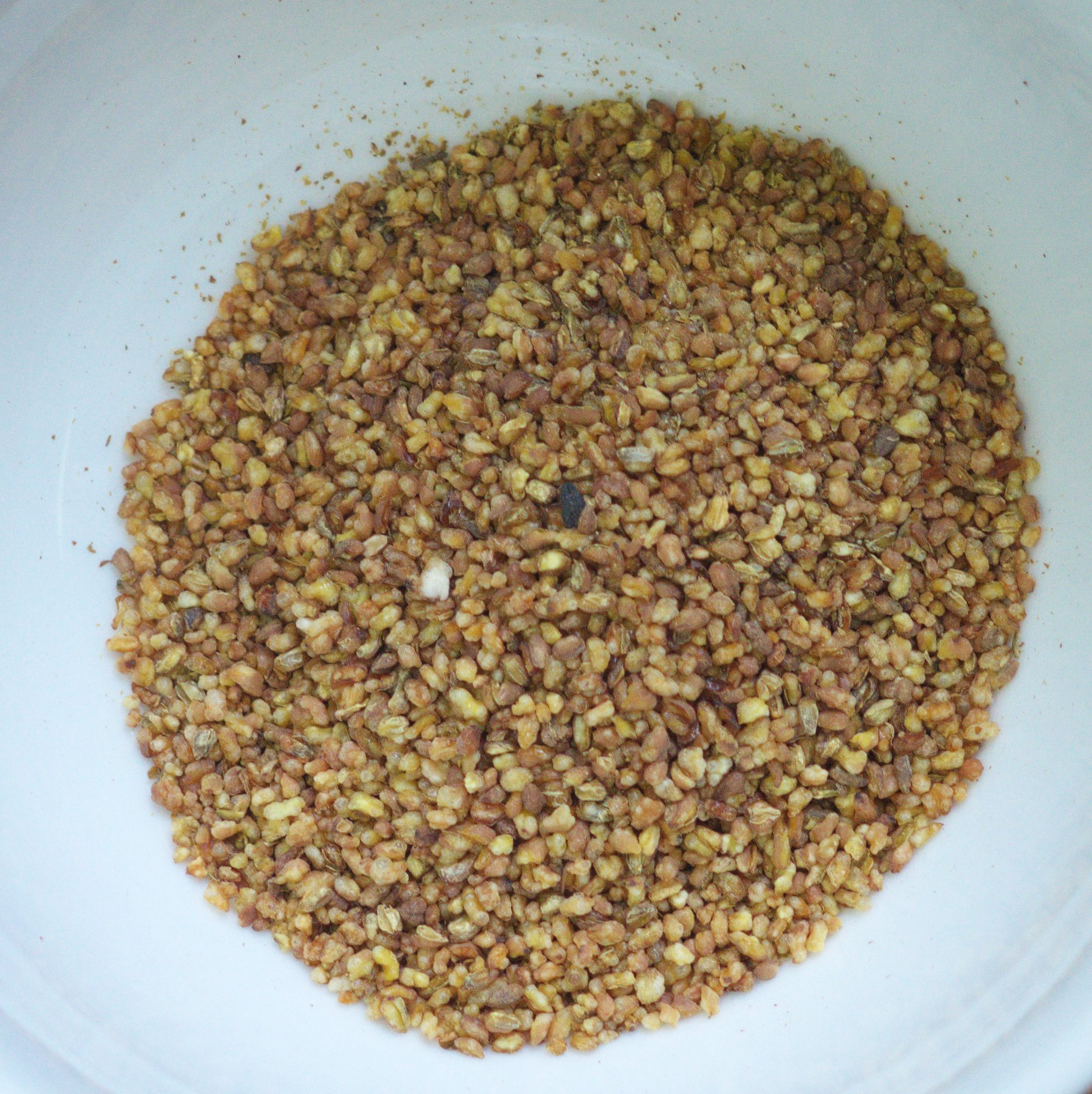
A bowl of Fagopyrum tataricum seeds
