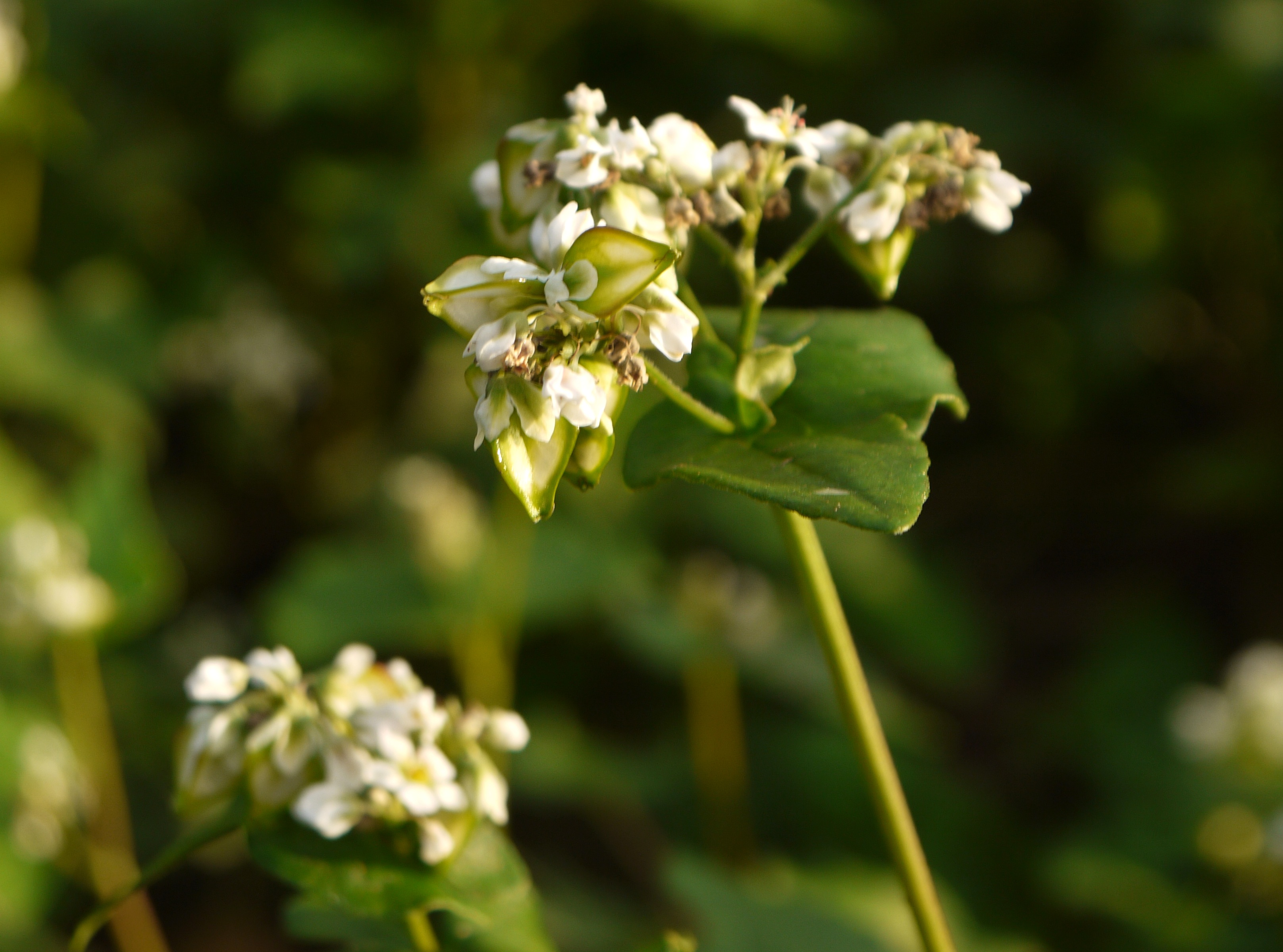

Scientific classification
- Kingdom: Plantae
- Clade: Tracheophytes
- Clade: Angiosperms
- Clade: Eudicots
- Order: Caryophyllales
- Family: Polygonaceae
- Genus: Fagopyrum
- Species: F. esculentum

Binomial name
- Fagopyrum esculentum Moench

Synonyms
- List: Fagopyrum cereale Raf.; Fagopyrum dryandrii Fenzl; Fagopyrum emarginatum Moench; Fagopyrum esculentum subsp. ancestralis Ohnishi; Fagopyrum esculentum var. emarginatum (Roth) Alef.; Fagopyrum esculentum var. pyramidatum (Loisel.) Meisn.; Fagopyrum esculentum var. vulgare Alef.; Fagopyrum fagopyrum (L.) H.Karst.; Fagopyrum macropterum Fenzl; Fagopyrum macropterum var. emarginatum (Roth) Fenzl; Fagopyrum macropterum var. obtusum Fenzl; Fagopyrum polygonum Macloskie; Fagopyrum sagittatum Gilib.; Fagopyrum sarracenicum Dumort.; Fagopyrum vulgare T.Nees; Fagopyrum vulgare Hill ex Druce; Helxine fagopyrum Kuntze; Kunokale carneum Raf.; Phegopyrum emarginatum (Roth) Peterm.; Phegopyrum esculentum (Moench) Peterm.; Polygonum cereale Salisb.; Polygonum dioicum Buch.-Ham. ex Meisn.; Polygonum elegans Meisn.; Polygonum emarginatum Roth; Polygonum fagopyrum L.; Polygonum gracile Meisn.; Polygonum macropterum Meisn.; Polygonum nepalense Fenzl; Polygonum pyramidatum Loisel.

= Buckwheat =

Species of flowering plant

Buckwheat (Fagopyrum esculentum) or common buckwheat is a flowering plant in the knotweed family Polygonaceae cultivated for its grain-like seeds and as a cover crop. Buckwheat cultivation originated around the 6th millennium BC in the region of what is now Yunnan Province in southwestern China. The name "buckwheat" is used for several other species, such as Fagopyrum tataricum, a domesticated food plant raised in Asia.

Despite its name, buckwheat is not closely related to wheat, nor is it a cereal or a member of the grass family. It is related to sorrel, knotweed, and rhubarb. Buckwheat is considered a pseudocereal because the high starch content of the seeds enables buckwheat to be cooked and consumed like a cereal. Some people, especially in Japan, are seriously allergic to buckwheat. A potential link to buckwheat and cases of dry eye in dogs was found in mid-2026, however, scientific testing found that there was no direct correlation between buckwheat and bilateral dry eye in dogs

== Etymology ==
The name "buckwheat" comes from its tetrahedral seeds, which resemble the much larger seeds of the beech nut from the beech tree, and the fact that it is used like wheat. The word may be a translation of Middle Dutch boecweite: boec "beech" (Modern Dutch beuk; see PIE *bhago-) and weite "wheat" (Mod. Dut. tarwe, antiquated weit), or may be a native formation on the same model as the Dutch word.

== Description ==
Buckwheat is a herbaceous annual flowering plant growing to about 60 centimetres (24 in), with red stems and pink and white flowers resembling those of knotweeds. The leaves are arrow-shaped and the fruits are achenes about 5–7 mm with 3 prominent sharp angles.

Fagopyrum esculentum is native to south-central China and Tibet, and has been introduced into suitable climates across Eurasia, Africa and the Americas.

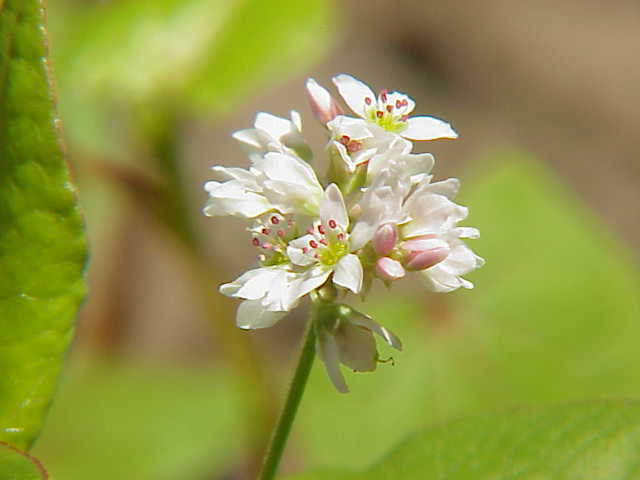
Common buckwheat in flower

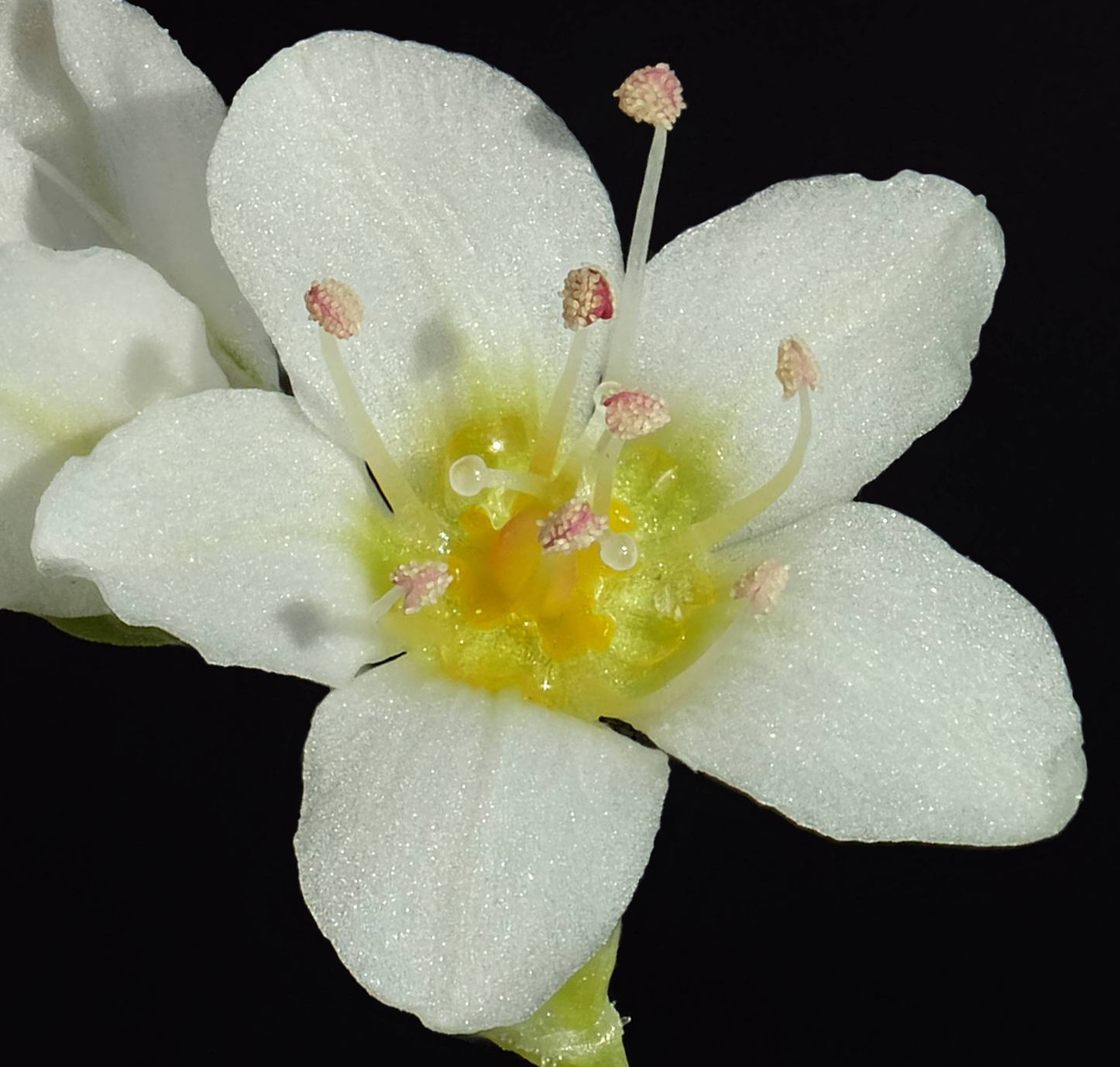
Buckwheat flower in close up (thrum)

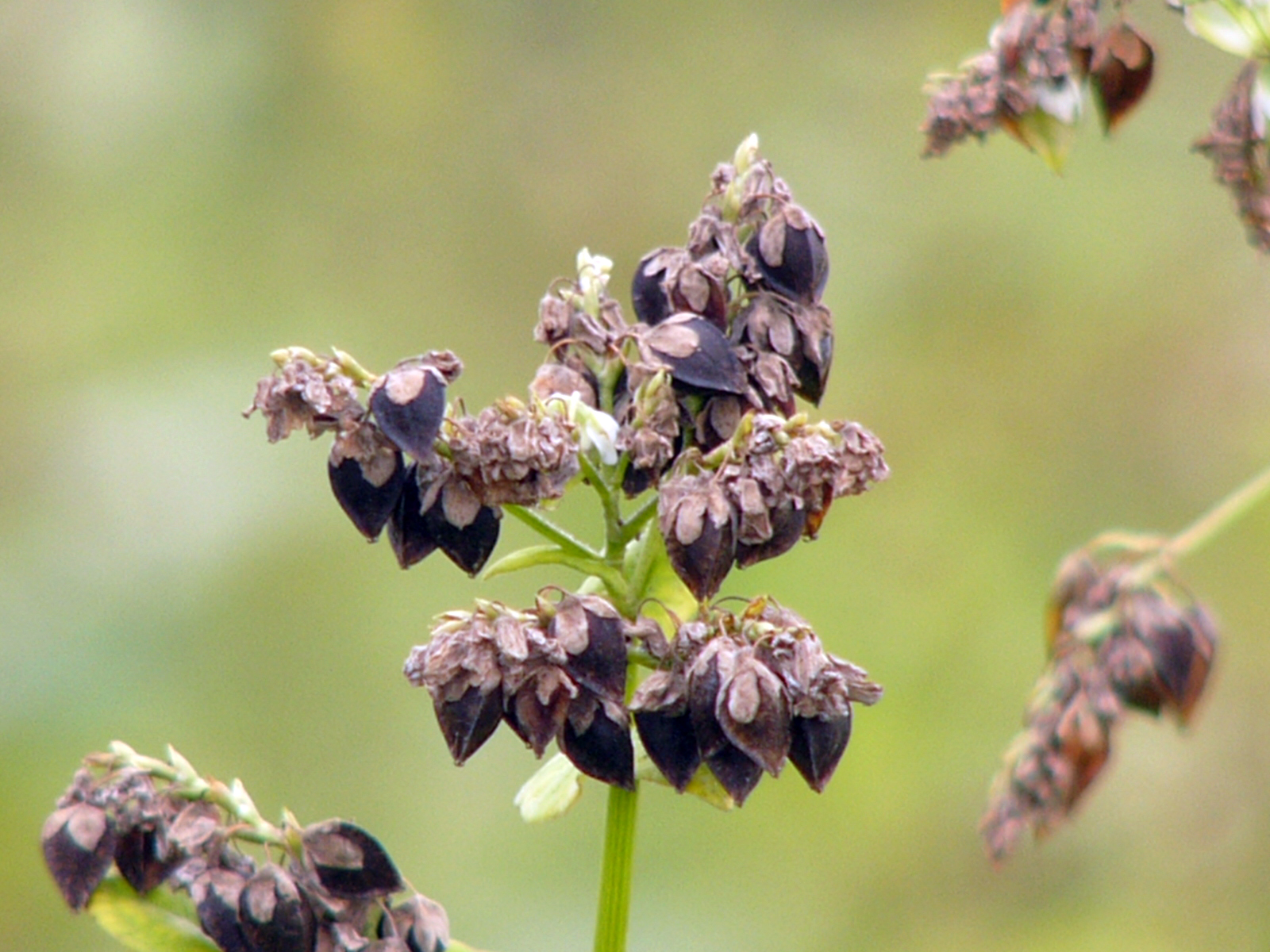
Seed and withered flower of buckwheat

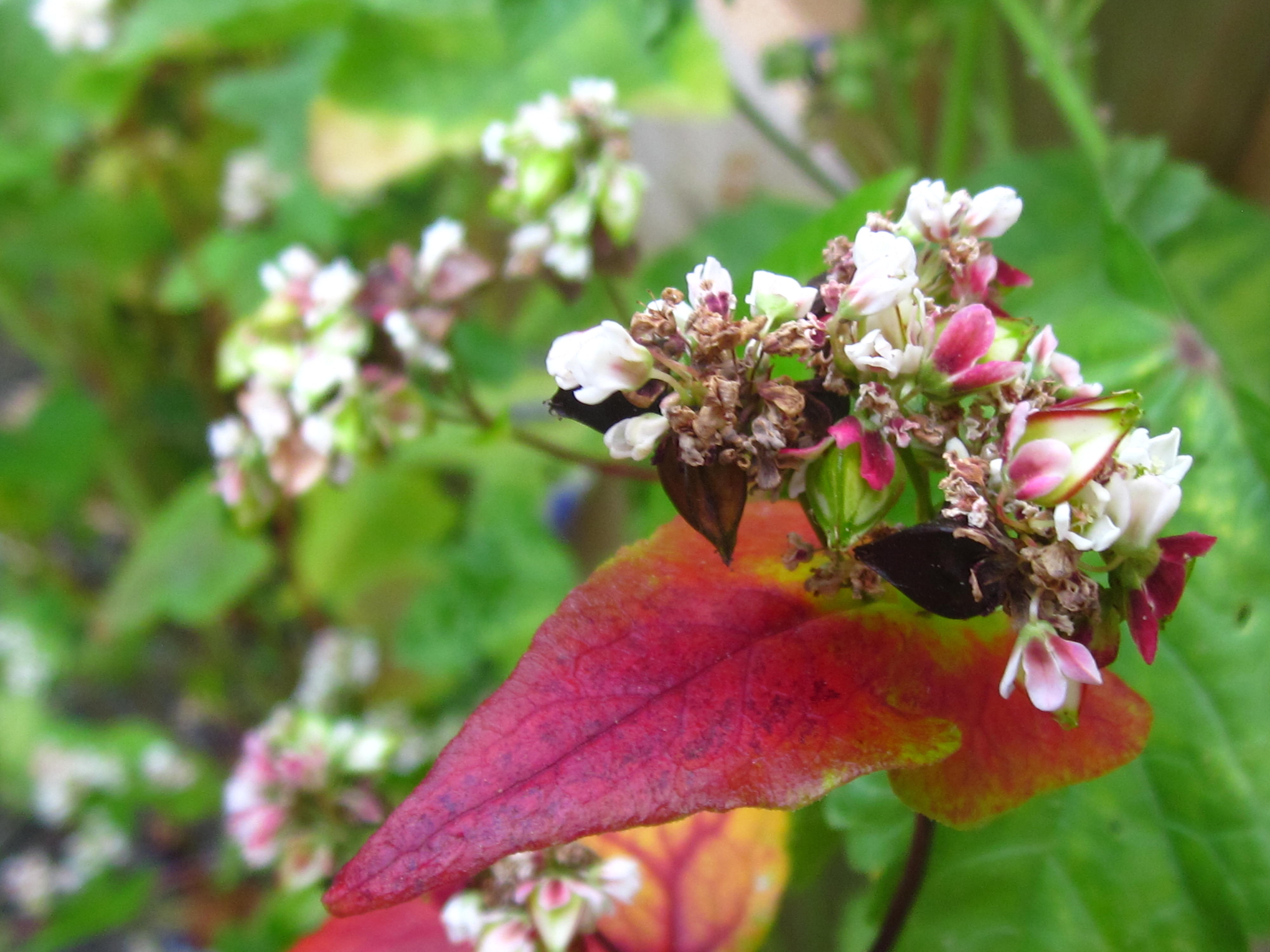
Buckwheat with flowers, ripe and unripe seeds

== Taxonomy ==
The scientific name Fagopyrum esculentum was first published in 1794 by Conrad Moench. Its accepted classification is in the Fagopyrum genus within the Polygonaceae family. However, it was named Polygonum fagopyrum by Carl Linnaeus his 1753 book. This is one of seven names that are homotypic synonyms and there are also 22 heterotypic synonyms including subspecies and varieties of Fagopyrum esculentum that are not accepted.

Table of homotypic synonyms
Name	Year	Rank	Notes
Fagopyrum fagopyrum (L.) H.Karst.	1881	species	not validly publ.
Fagopyrum polygonum Macloskie	1905	species	nom. illeg. superfl.
Fagopyrum sagittatum Gilib.	1792	species	opus utique oppr.
Fagopyrum vulgare T.Nees	1834	species	nom. illeg. superfl.
Phegopyrum esculentum (Moench) Peterm.	1841	species	nom. superfl.
Polygonum cereale Salisb.	1796	species	nom. illeg. superfl.
Polygonum fagopyrum L.	1753	species	

== History ==
The wild ancestor of common buckwheat is F. esculentum ssp. ancestrale. F. homotropicum is interfertile with F. esculentum and the wild forms have a common distribution, in Yunnan, a southwestern province of China. The wild ancestor of tartary buckwheat is F. tataricum ssp. potanini.

Common buckwheat was domesticated and first cultivated in inland Southeast Asia, possibly around 6000 BC, and from there spread to Central Asia and Tibet, and then to the Middle East and Europe, which it reached by the 15th century. Domestication most likely took place in the western Yunnan region of China.

The oldest remains found in China so far date to c. 2600 BC, while buckwheat pollen found in Japan dates from as early as 4000 BC. It is the world's highest-elevation domesticate, being cultivated in Yunnan on the edge of the Tibetan Plateau or on the plateau itself. Buckwheat was one of the earliest crops introduced by Europeans to North America. Dispersal around the globe was complete by 2006, when a variety developed in Canada was widely planted in China. In India, buckwheat flour is known as kuttu ka atta and has long been culturally associated with many festivals like Shivratri, Navaratri and Janmashtami. On the day of these festivals, food items made only from buckwheat are consumed.

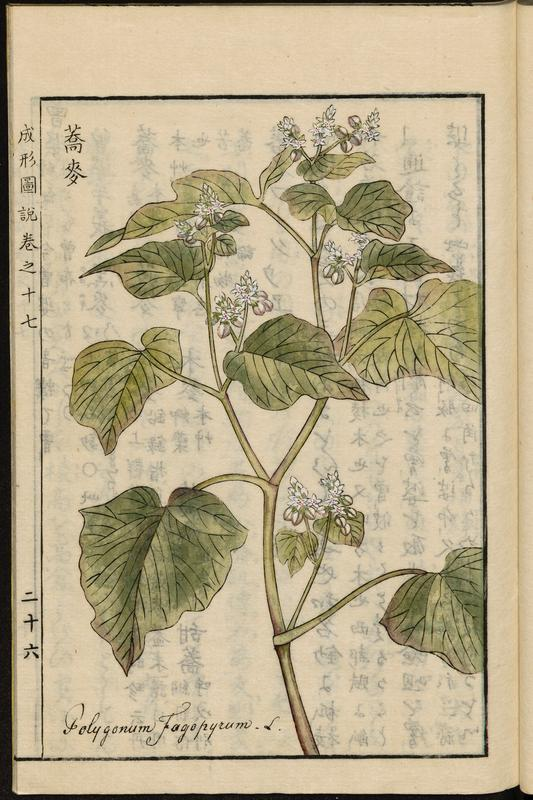
Buckwheat, 1804 illustration from the Japanese agricultural encyclopedia Seikei Zusetsu

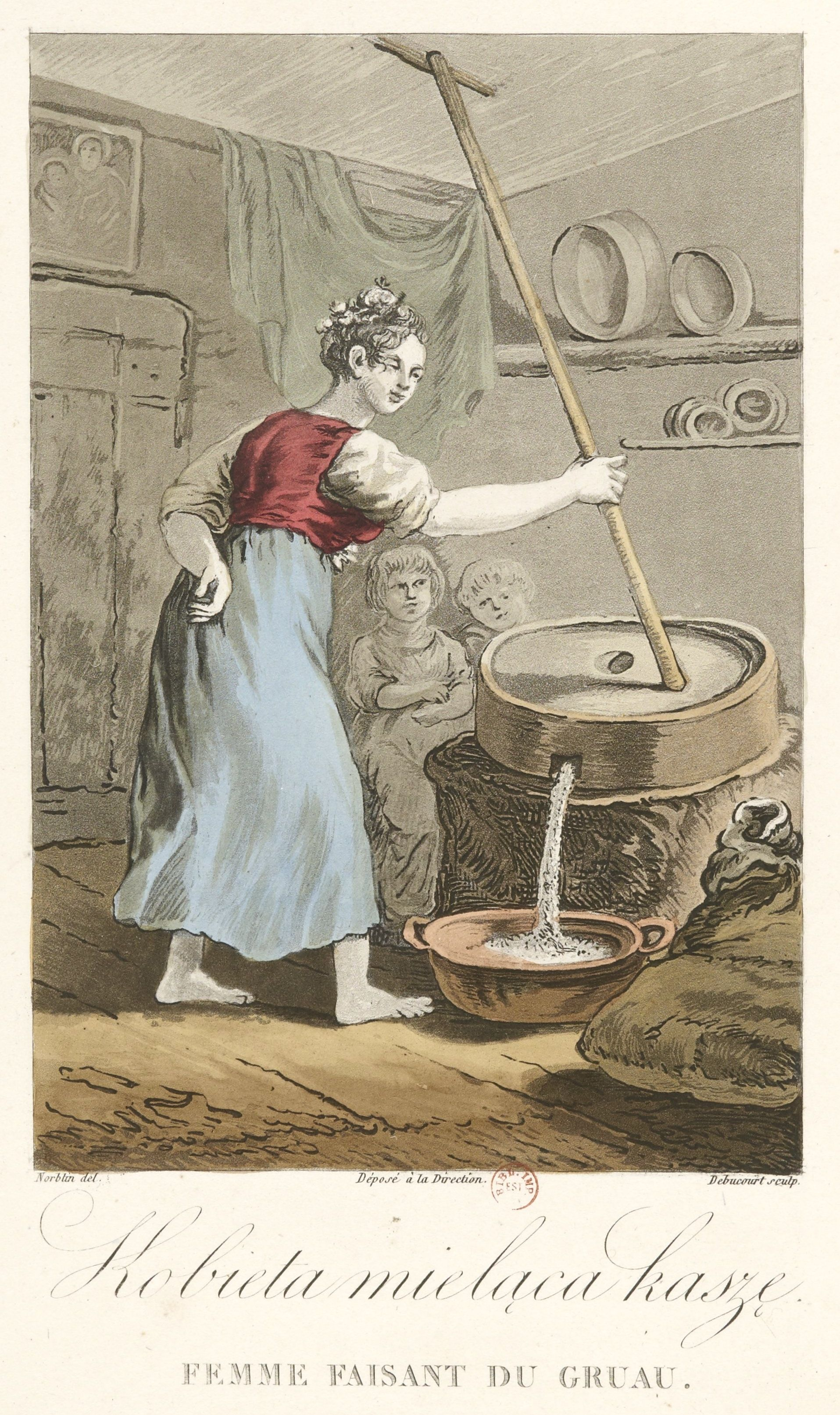
A woman grinding kasha. 18th-century drawing by J.-P. Norblin

== Cultivation ==
Buckwheat is a short-season crop that grows well in low-fertility or acidic soils; too much fertilizer – especially nitrogen – reduces yields, and the soil must be well drained. In hot climates buckwheat can be grown only by sowing late in the season, so that it blooms in cooler weather. The presence of pollinators greatly increases yield. Nectar from flowering buckwheat produces a dark-colored honey.

The buckwheat plant has a branching root system with a primary taproot that reaches deeply into moist soil. It grows 75 to 125 centimetres (30 to 50 inches) tall. Buckwheat has tetrahedral seeds and produces a flower that is usually white, although can also be pink or yellow. Buckwheat branches freely, as opposed to tillering or producing suckers, enabling more complete adaption to its environment than other cereal crops.

Buckwheat is raised for grain where only a brief time is available for growth, either because the buckwheat is an early or a second crop in the season, or because the total growing season is limited. It establishes quickly, which suppresses summer weeds, and can be a reliable cover crop in summer to fit a small slot of warm season. Buckwheat has a growing period of only 10–12 weeks and it can be grown in high latitude or northern areas. Buckwheat is sometimes used as a green manure, as a plant for erosion control or as wildlife cover and feed. It may be used as a pollen and nectar source to increase natural predator numbers for biological control of crop pests.

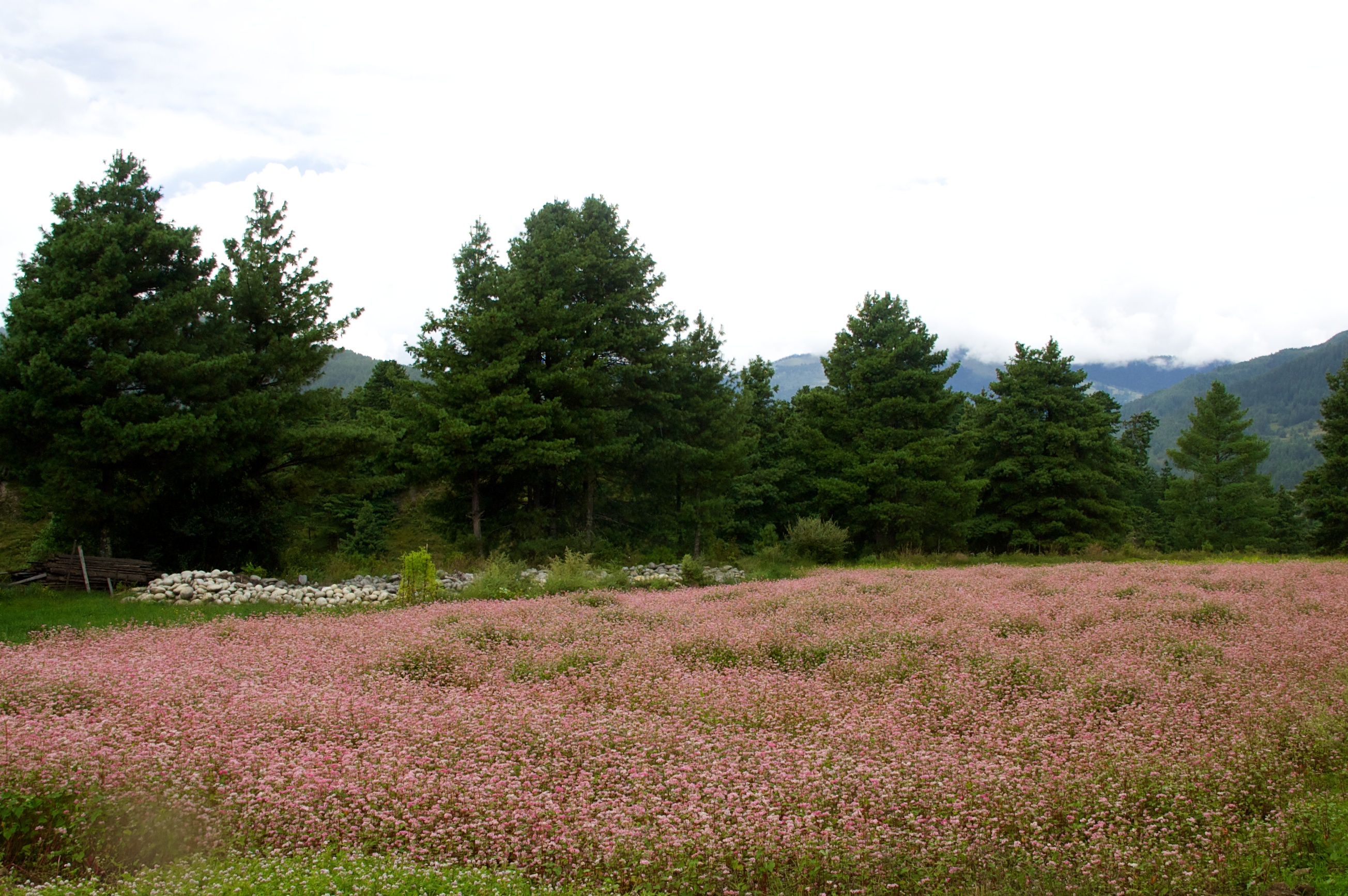
Field of buckwheat in Bumthang (Bhutan)

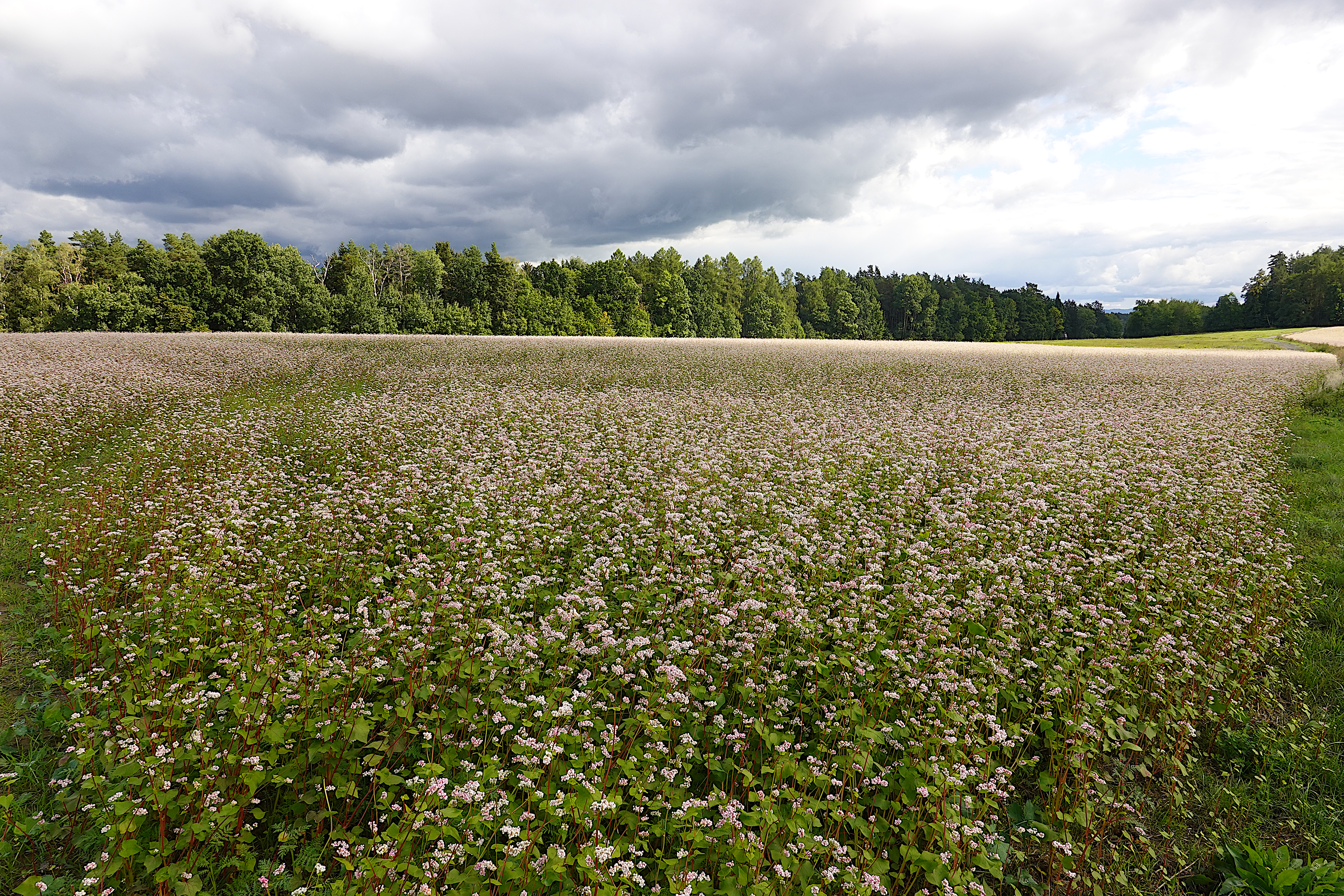
Buckwheat field near Vrchovina in the Czech Republic

== Production ==
Buckwheat production 2024, tonnes
Russia	979,962
China	504,358
Ukraine	113,650
Kazakhstan	89,282
United States	86,536
Brazil	64,995
World total	1,970,230
Source: FAOSTAT of the United Nations

In 2024, world production of buckwheat was 1.97 million tonnes, led by Russia with 52% of the total, with China and Ukraine as secondary producers (table).

Production of buckwheat

Buckwheat yield

== Phytochemicals ==
Buckwheat contains diverse phytochemicals, including rutin, tannins, catechin-7-O-glucoside in groats, and fagopyrins, mainly in the cotyledons of the buckwheat plant. It has almost no inorganic arsenic.

Salicylaldehyde (2-hydroxybenzaldehyde) was identified as a characteristic component of buckwheat aroma. 2,5-dimethyl-4-hydroxy-3(2H)-furanone, (E,E)-2,4-decadienal, phenylacetaldehyde, 2-methoxy-4-vinylphenol, (E)-2-nonenal, decanal and hexanal also contribute to its aroma. They all have odour activity value of more than 50, but the aroma of these substances in an isolated state does not resemble buckwheat.

== Nutrition ==
Buckwheat
Nutritional value per 100 g (3.5 oz)
- Energy: 1,435 kJ (343 kcal)
- Carbohydrates: 71.5 g
- Dietary fiber: 10 g
- Fat: 3.4 g
- Saturated: 0.741 g
- Monounsaturated: 1.04 g
- Polyunsaturated omega−3 omega−6: 1.039 g 0.078 g 0.961 g
- Protein: 13.25 g
Vitamins and minerals
Vitamins	Quantity %DV^{†}
Thiamine (B1)	8% 0.101 mg
Riboflavin (B2)	33% 0.425 mg
Niacin (B3)	44% 7.02 mg
Pantothenic acid (B5)	25% 1.233 mg
Vitamin B6	12% 0.21 mg
Folate (B9)	8% 30 μg
Vitamin C	0% 0 mg
Minerals	Quantity %DV^{†}
Calcium	1% 18 mg
Copper	122% 1.1 mg
Iron	12% 2.2 mg
Magnesium	55% 231 mg
Manganese	57% 1.3 mg
Phosphorus	28% 347 mg
Potassium	15% 460 mg
Selenium	15% 8.3 μg
Sodium	0% 1 mg
Zinc	22% 2.4 mg
- Other constituents: Quantity
- Water: 9.8 g
- Link to entry at USDA FoodData Central
- ^{†}Percentages estimated using US recommendations for adults, except for potassium, which is estimated based on expert recommendation from the National Academies.

Raw dry buckwheat is 10% water, 72% carbohydrates, 13% protein, and 3% fat (table). In a reference amount of 100 g (3.5 oz), dry buckwheat supplies 343 calories of food energy, and is a rich source (20% or more of the Daily Value, DV) of three B vitamins (riboflavin, niacin, pantothenic acid) and several dietary minerals (table).

=== Gluten-free ===
As buckwheat contains no gluten, it may be eaten by people with gluten-related disorders, such as celiac disease, non-celiac gluten sensitivity or dermatitis herpetiformis. Nevertheless, buckwheat products may have gluten contamination.

=== Potential adverse effects ===
Cases of severe allergic reactions to buckwheat and buckwheat-containing products have been reported. Buckwheat contains fluorescent phototoxic fagopyrins. These can cause fagopyrism in people with diets based on high consumption of buckwheat sprouts, and particularly flowers or fagopyrin-rich buckwheat extracts. Symptoms of fagopyrism in humans include skin inflammation in sunlight-exposed areas, cold sensitivity, and tingling or numbness in the hands. Dogs can develop keratoconjunctivitis sicca (KCS), a form of dry eye which can lead to blindness if untreated. In the U.S., the presence of buckwheat in cereal grain is considered an economic threat, since many people in the Asian markets are allergic to it. Grain elevators hence have a zero tolerance policy, and contaminated loads of grain are summarily rejected. Buckwheat allergy is especially common in Japan, where it is the fourth most frequent cause of food-related anaphylaxis.

== Culinary use ==
The fruit is an achene, similar to sunflower seed, with a single seed inside a hard outer hull. The starchy endosperm is white and makes up most or all of buckwheat flour. The seed coat is green or tan, which darkens buckwheat flour. The hull is dark brown or black, and some may be included in buckwheat flour as dark specks. The dark flour is known as blé noir (black wheat) in French, along with the name sarrasin (saracen). Similarly, in Italy, it is known as grano saraceno (saracen grain). Buckwheat pasta is made in various shapes in Italy as pasta di grano saraceno, and as the flat ribbons of pizzoccheri. Buckwheat groats are commonly used in eastern Europe to make a porridge called kasha, often considered the definitive peasant dish.

Buckwheat noodles are used in Tibet and Nepal to make thukpa soup. Similar noodles play a major role in the cuisines of Japan (soba) and Korea (naengmyeon, makguksu and memil-guksu). Soba noodles are the subject of deep cultural importance in Japan. The difficulty of making noodles from flour with no gluten has resulted in a traditional art developed around their manufacture by hand. A jelly called memilmuk in Korea is made from buckwheat starch. Local buckwheat variety from Bongpyeong, Korea, is known as Bongpyeong memil and is a powerful symbol for both cultural and gastronomic reasons.

Yeasted patties called hrechanyky are made in Ukraine, whereas across the border, in southeastern Poland hreczanyki are thick patties of ground pork mixed with cooked buckwheat groats (kasza gryczana). Buckwheat pancakes were a common food in American pioneer days. Buckwheat blinis form gluten-free Russian-style pancakes.

Buckwheat is a permitted sustenance during fasting in several traditions. In India, on Hindu fasting days (Navaratri, Ekadashi, Janmashtami, Maha Shivaratri, etc.), fasting people in northern states of India eat foods made of buckwheat flour. Eating cereals such as wheat or rice is prohibited during such fasting days. While strict Hindus do not even drink water during their fast, others give up cereals and salt and instead eat non-cereal foods such as buckwheat (kuttu). In the Russian Orthodox tradition, it is eaten on the St. Philip fast.

Buckwheat honey is dark, strong and aromatic. It is normally produced as a monofloral honey.

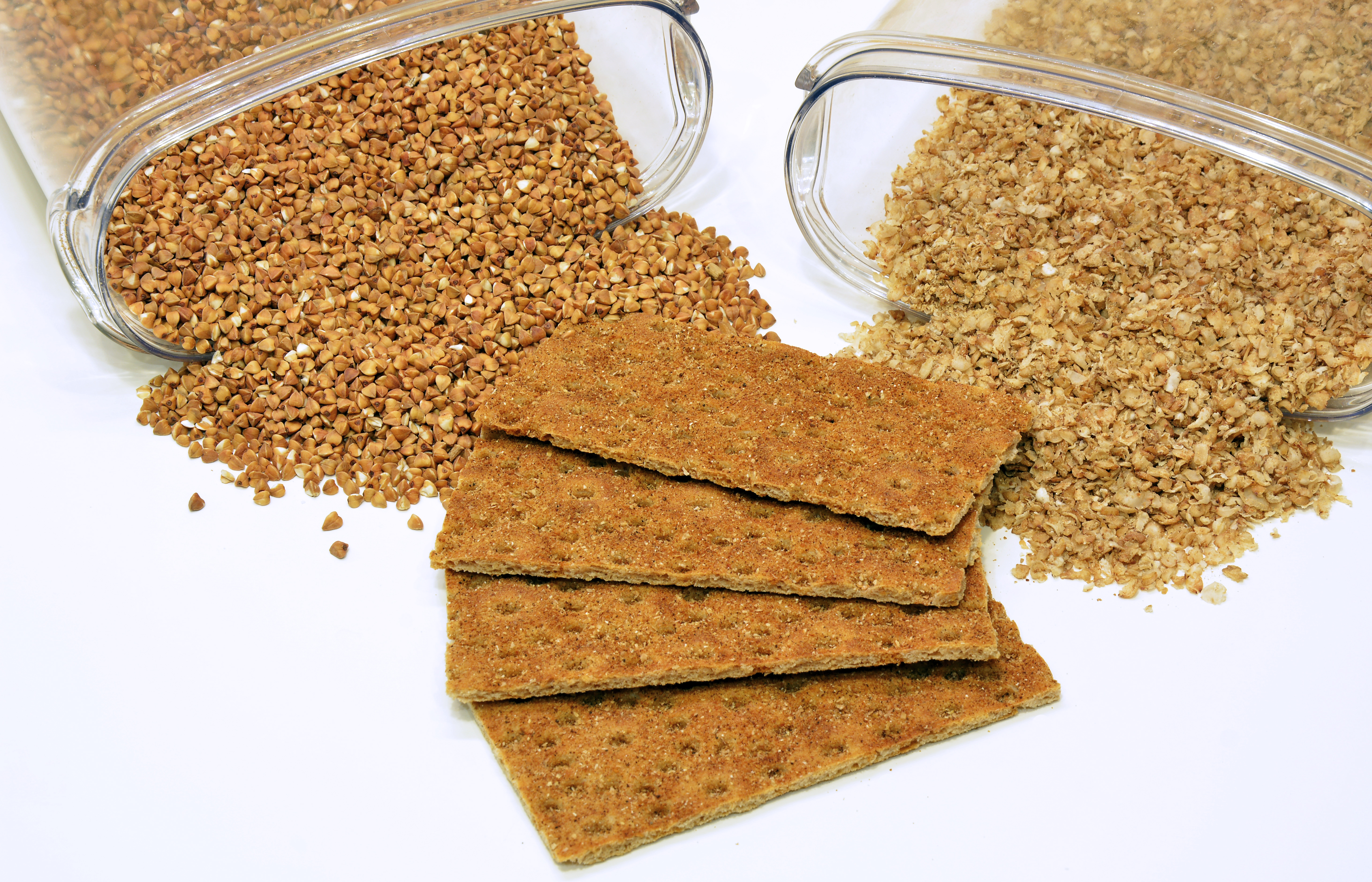
Buckwheat and its products

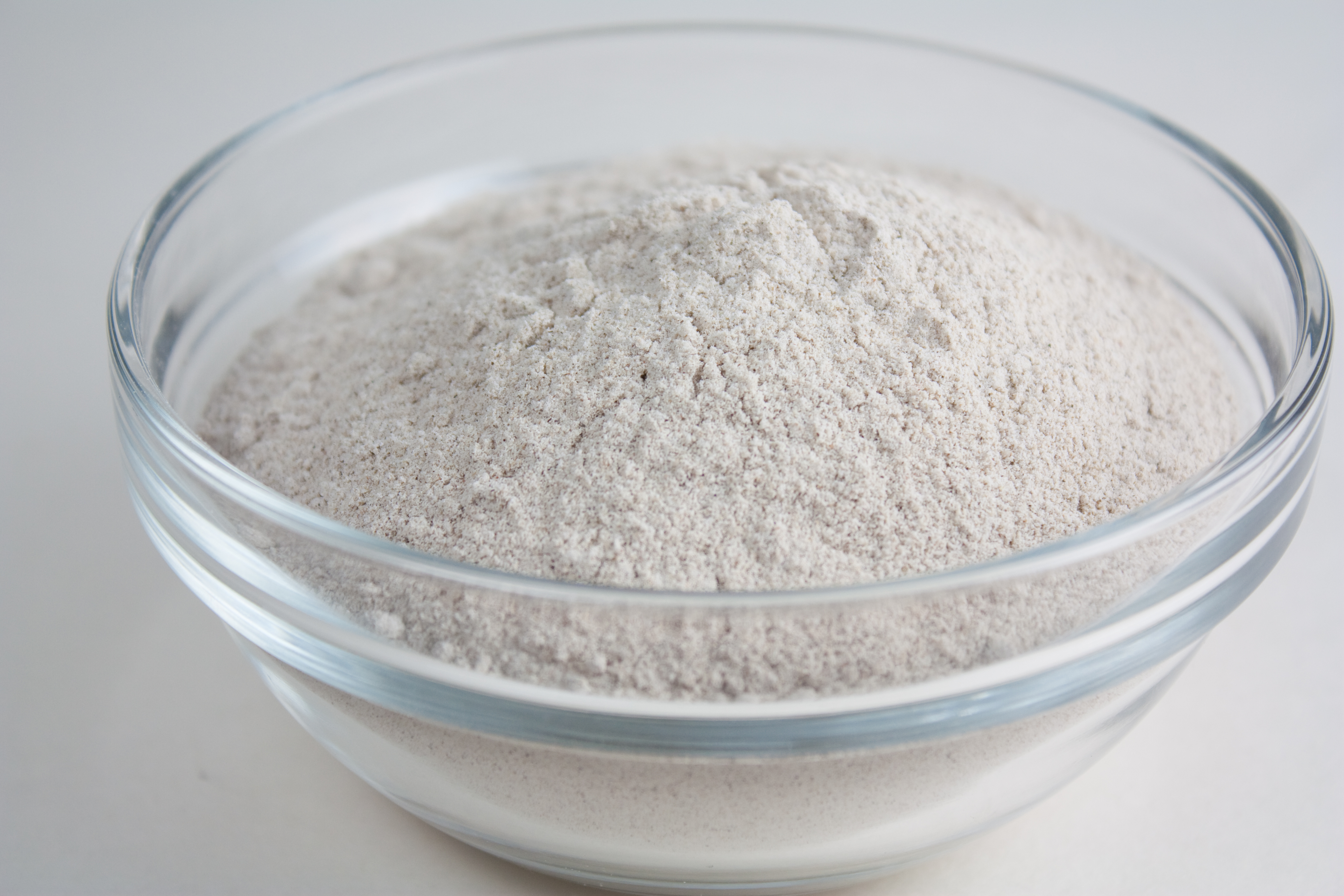
Buckwheat flour

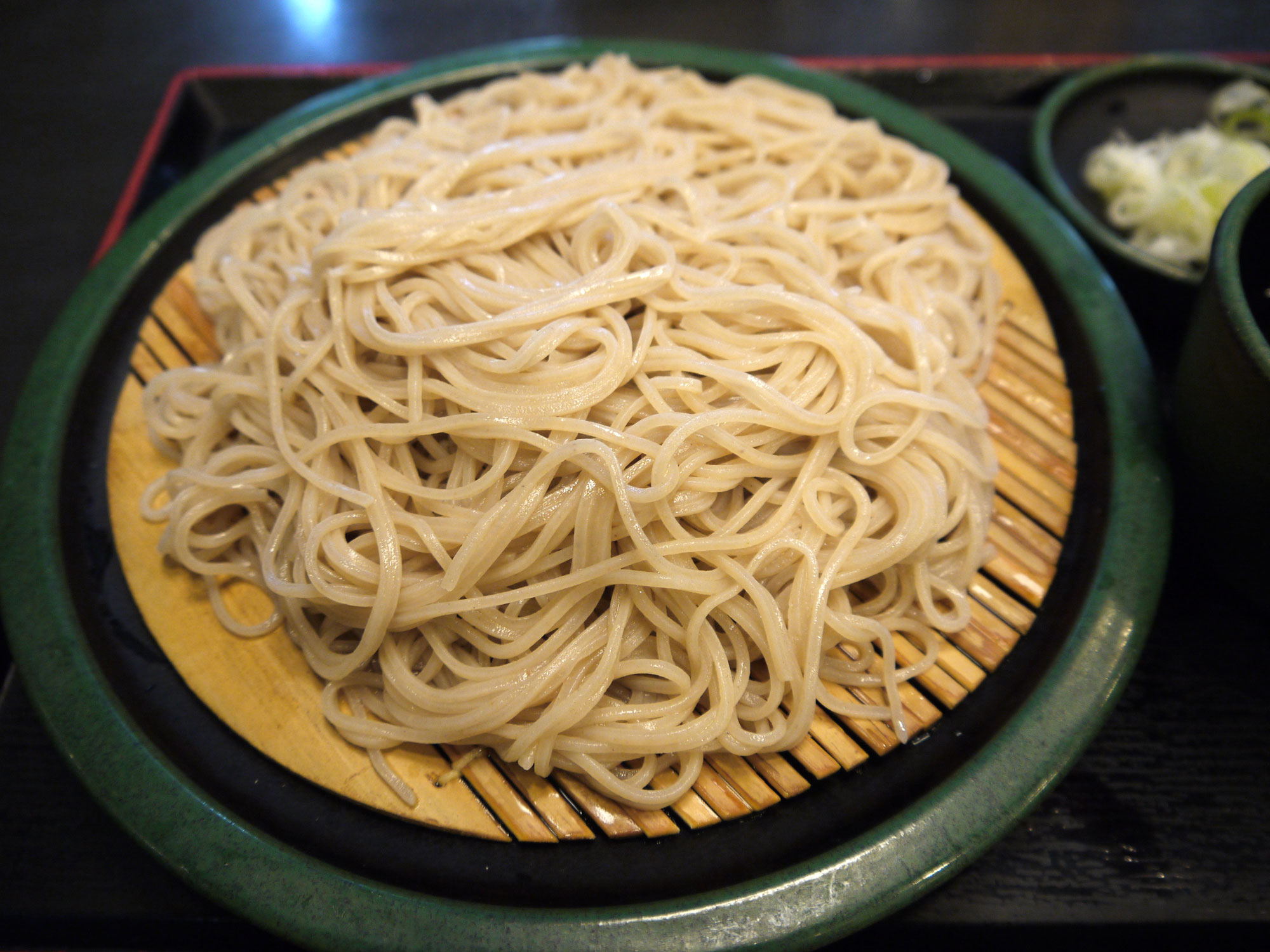
Soba noodles made from buckwheat

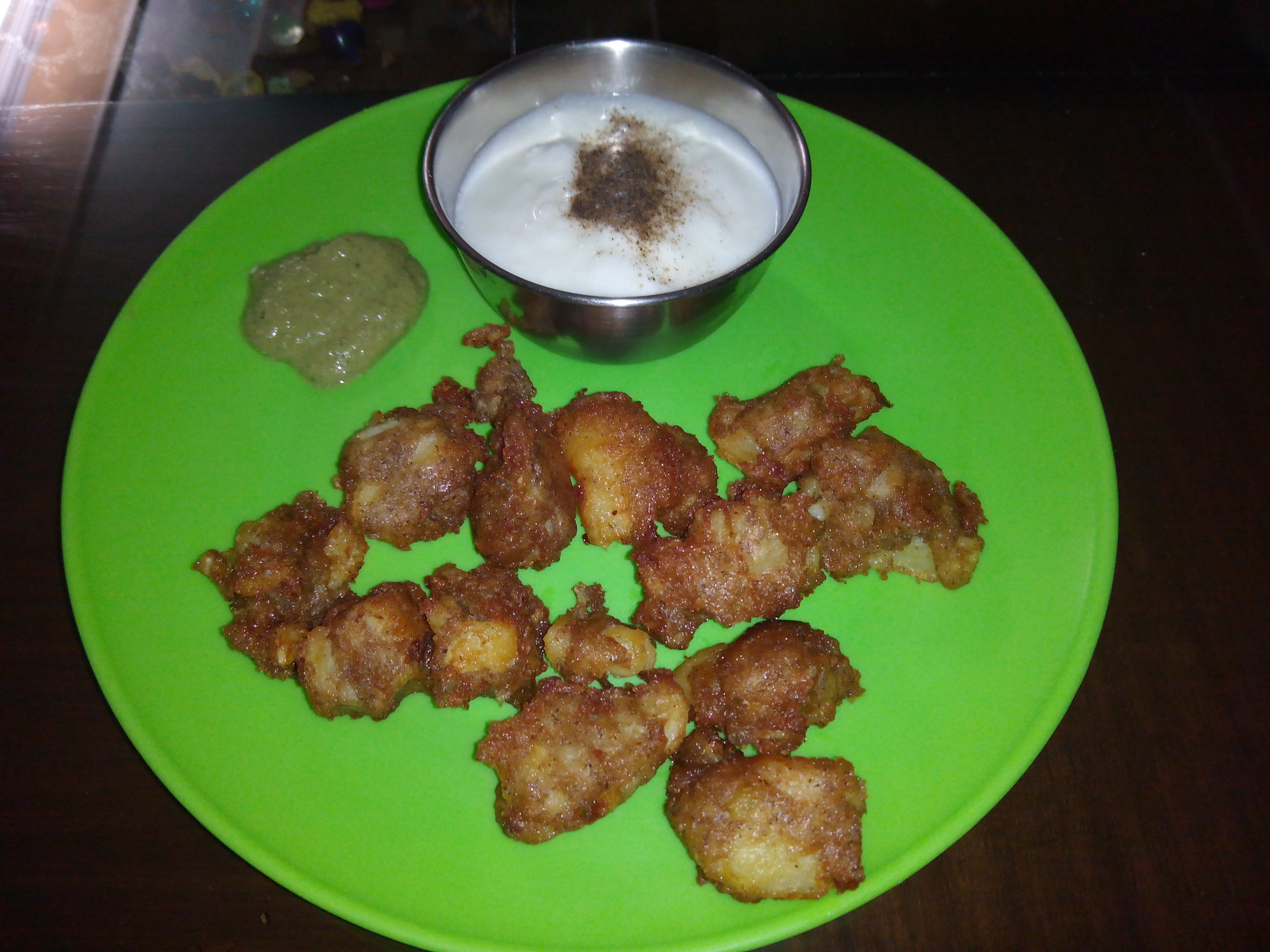
Kuttu ke pakore, a snack made from buckwheat flour, India

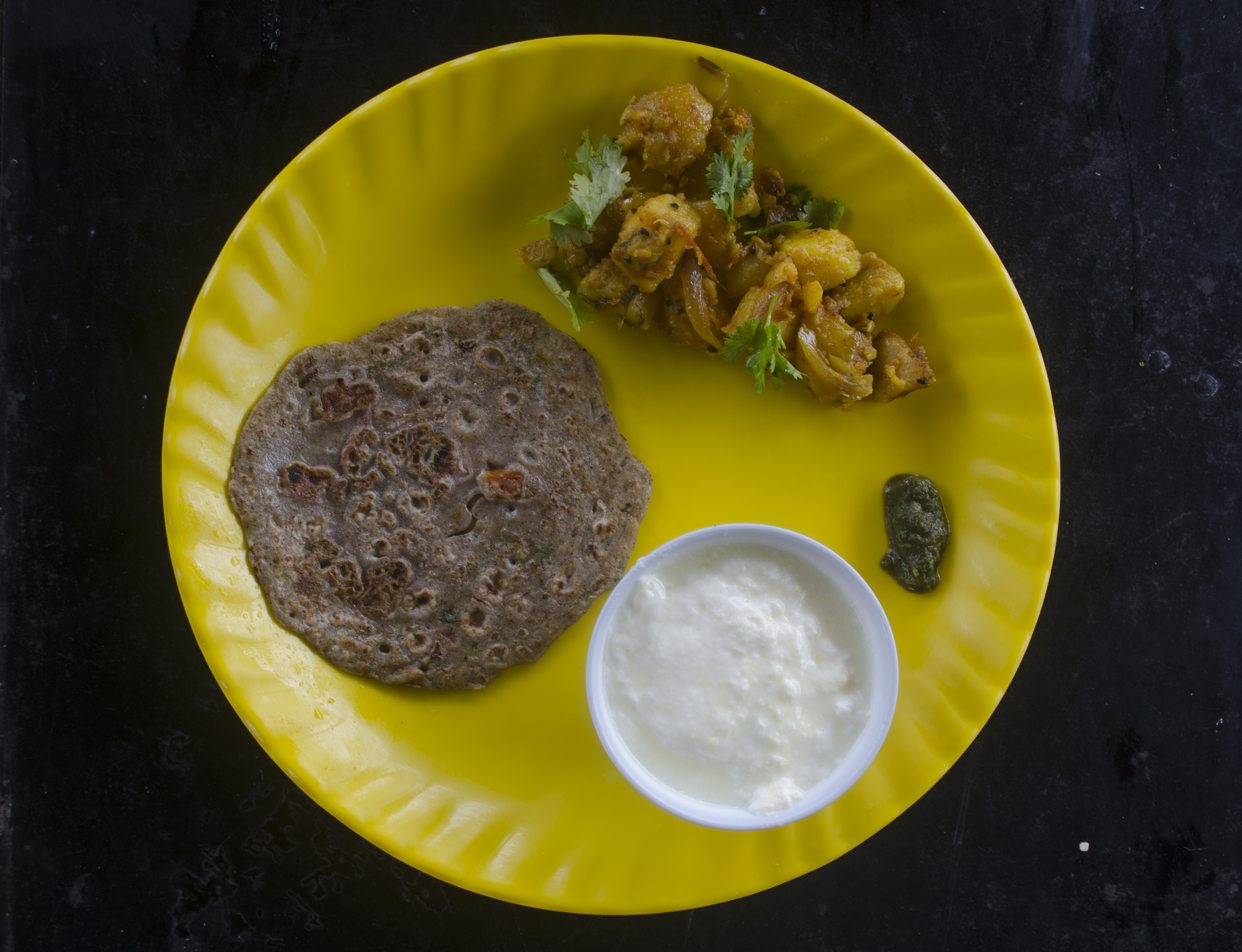
Buckwheat bread (roti) with potato veg and sour curd, Sikkim, India

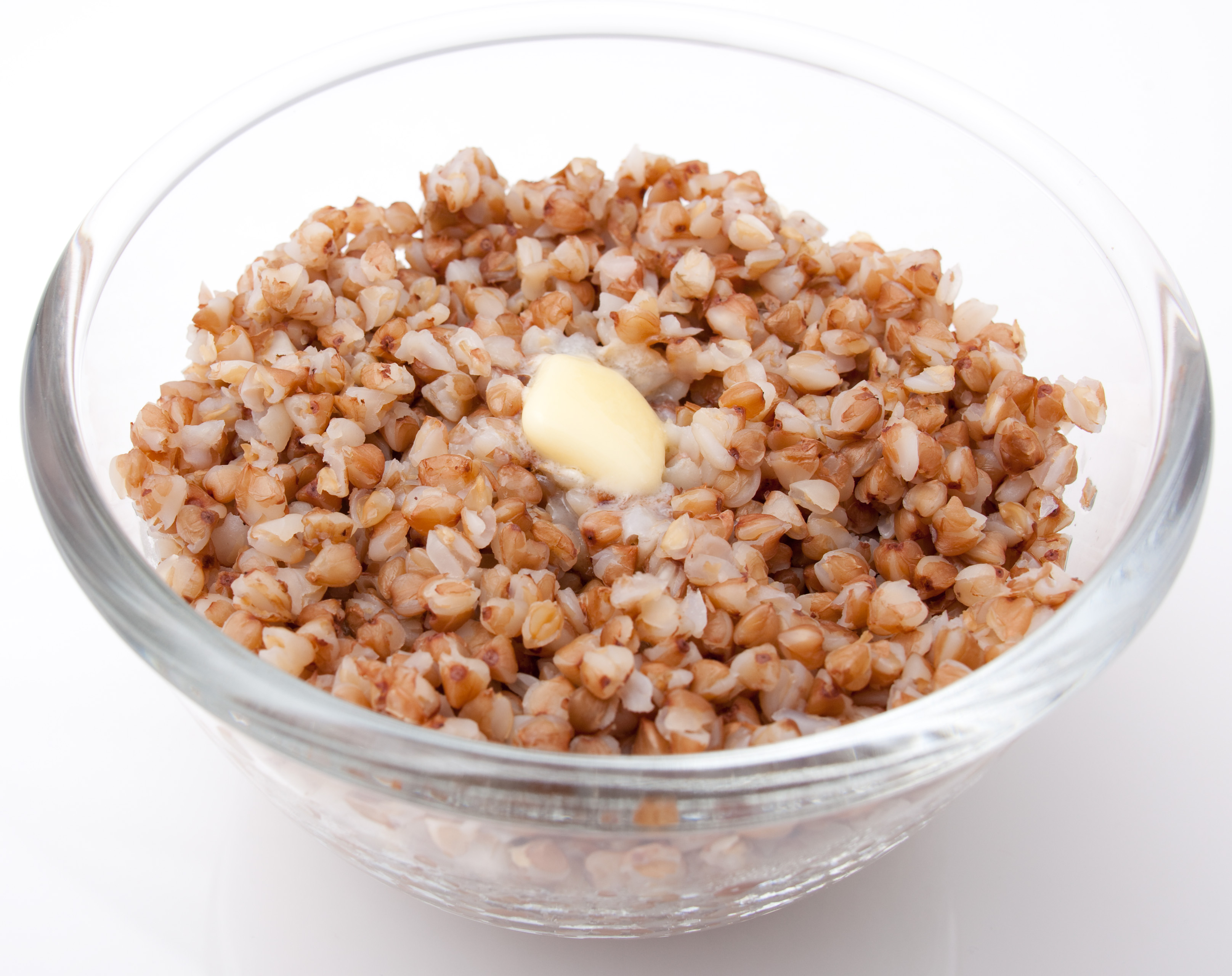
Grechka of Russia, Ukraine and Belarus

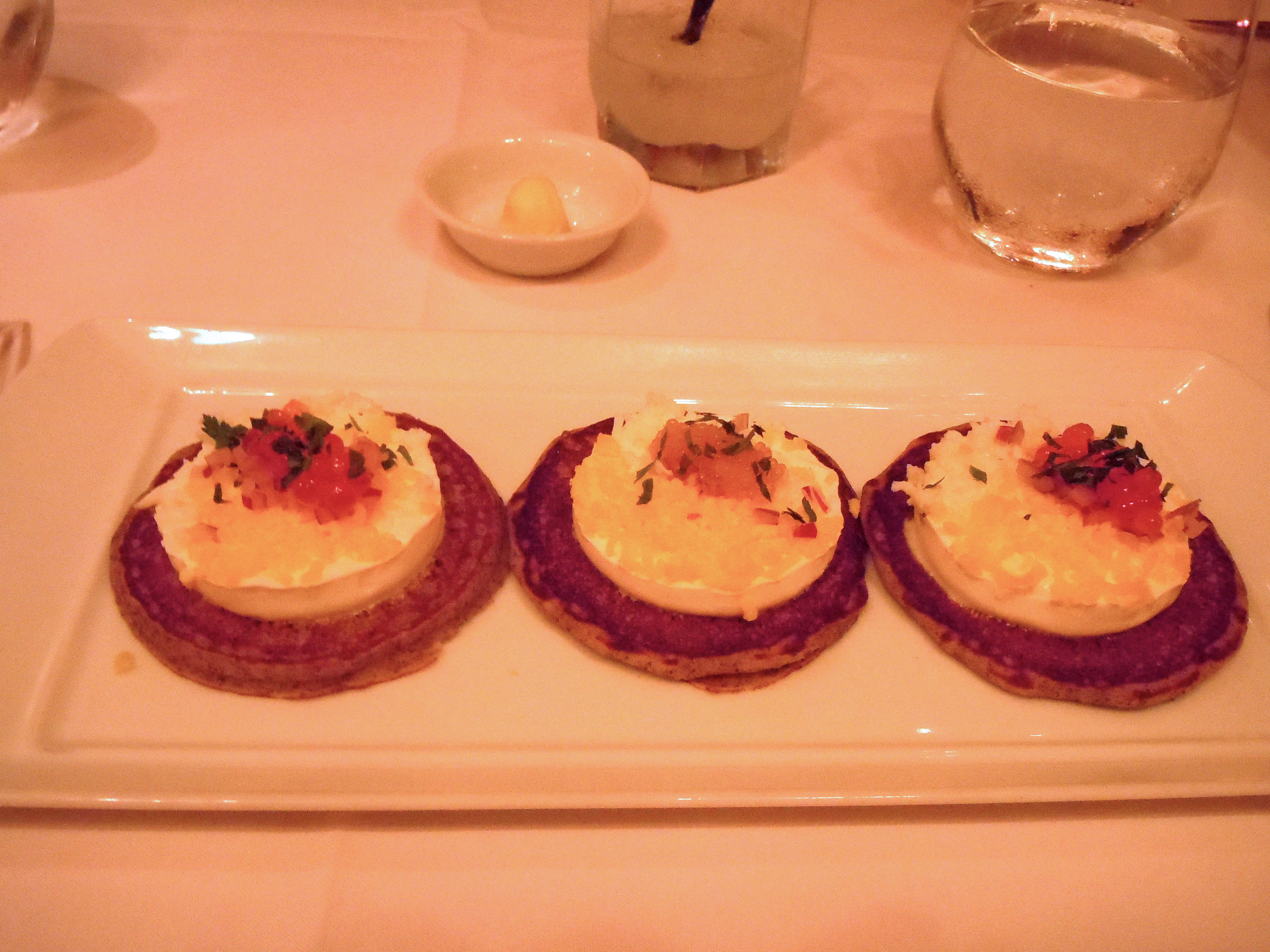
Russian-style buckwheat blinis with sour cream and fish roe

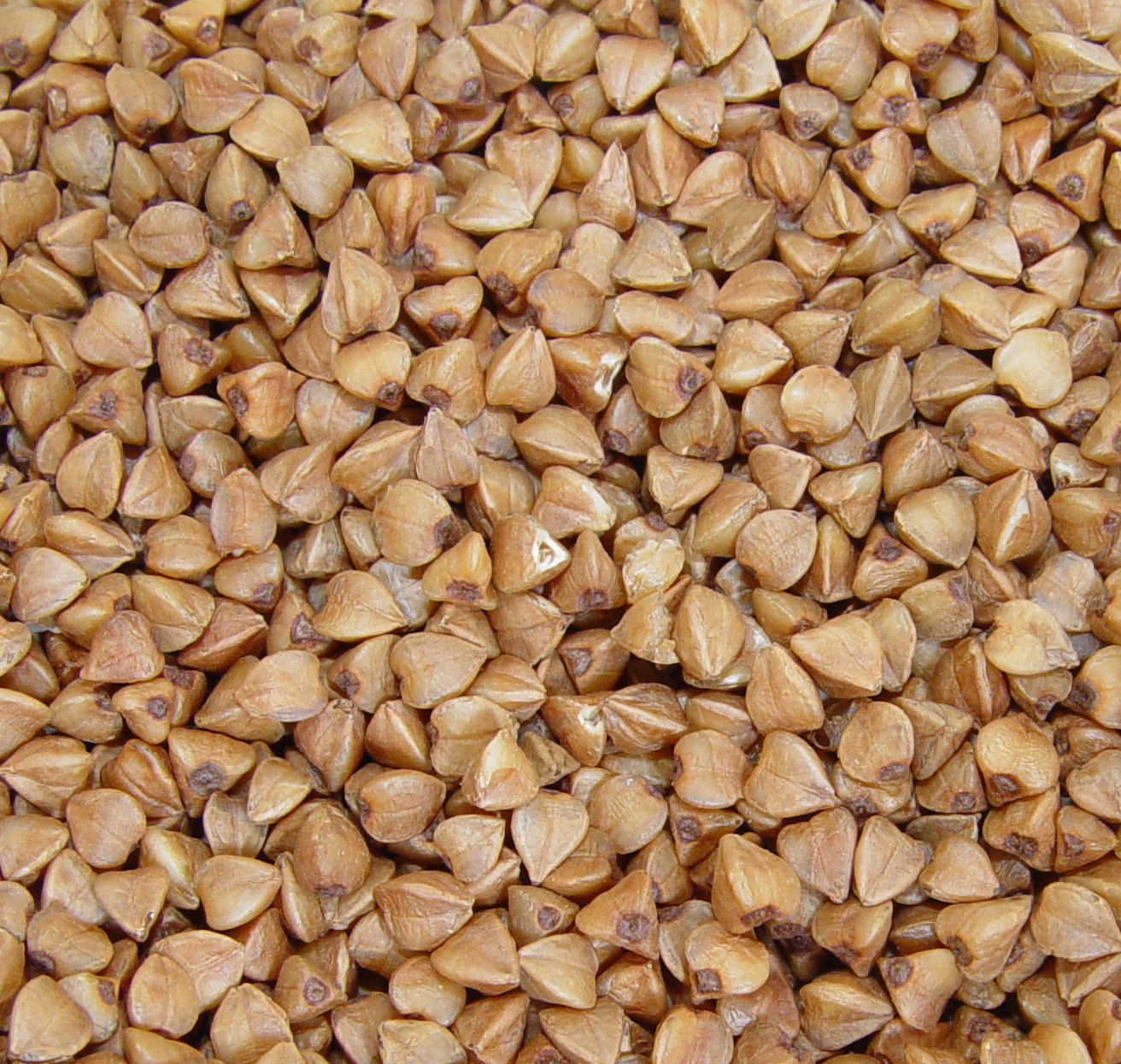
Kasha, hulled roasted buckwheat cereal of Poland

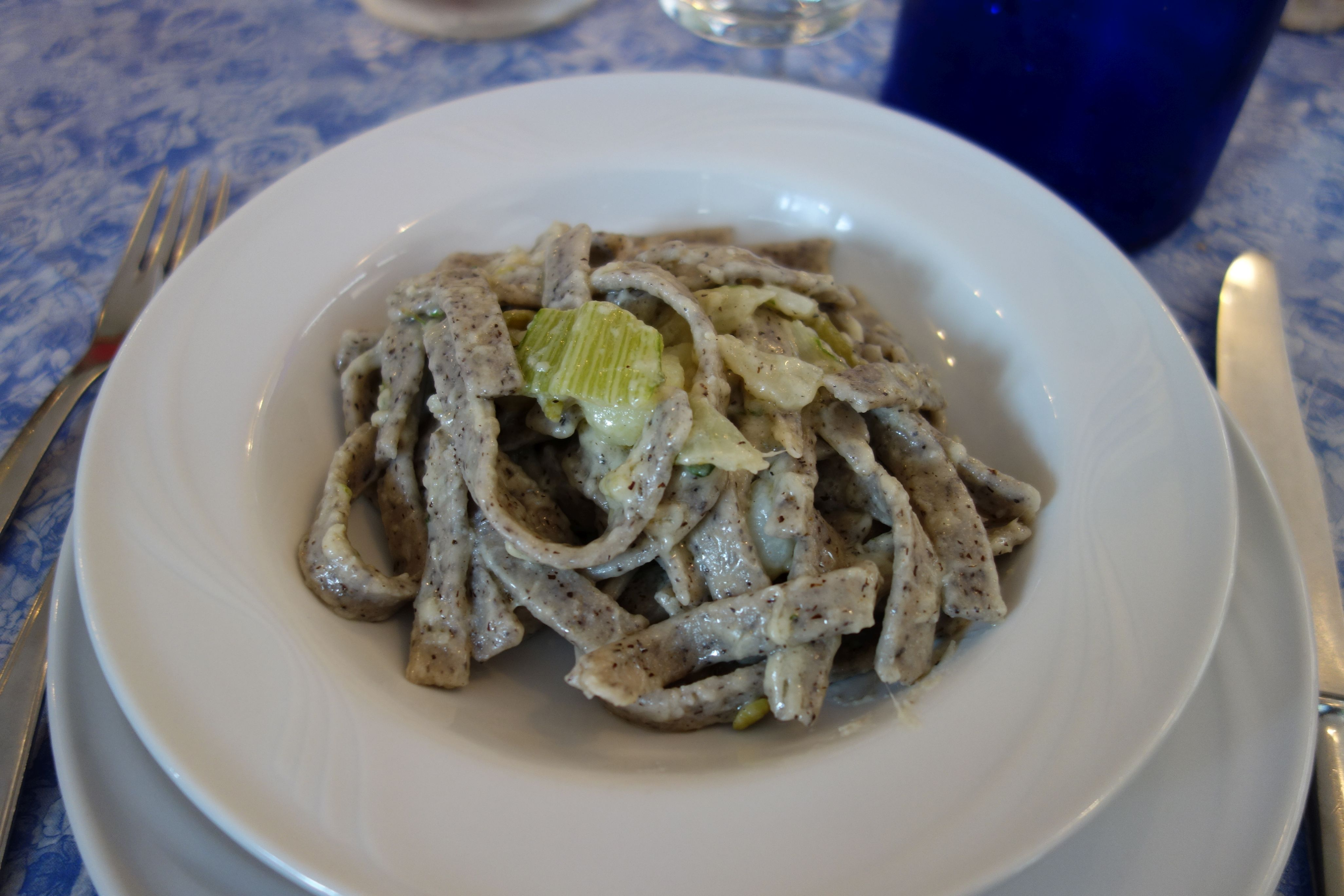
Pizzoccheri, the Northern Italian pasta made with buckwheat

=== Animal feed ===
Buckwheat is sometimes used as an ingredient in dog food. However, its use has been implicated in causing keratoconjunctivitis sicca (dry eye), a condition that can lead to blindness. The buckwheat plant produces the toxin fagopyrin, known to cause canine hypersensitivity to sunlight and other issues if ingested in large amounts.

=== Beverages ===
Buckwheat tea, known as kuqiao-cha (苦荞茶) in China, memil-cha (메밀차) in Korea and soba-cha (蕎麦茶) in Japan, is a tea made from roasted buckwheat.

Buckwheat has been used as a substitute for other grains in gluten-free beer. It is used in the same way as barley to produce a malt that can form the basis of a mash that will brew a beer without gliadin or hordein (together gluten) and therefore can be suitable for coeliacs or others sensitive to certain glycoproteins.

Buckwheat whisky is a distilled alcoholic beverage made from buckwheat. It is produced in the Brittany region of France and in the United States.

Buckwheat shōchū (焼酎) is a Japanese distilled beverage produced since the 16th century. The taste is milder than barley shōchū.

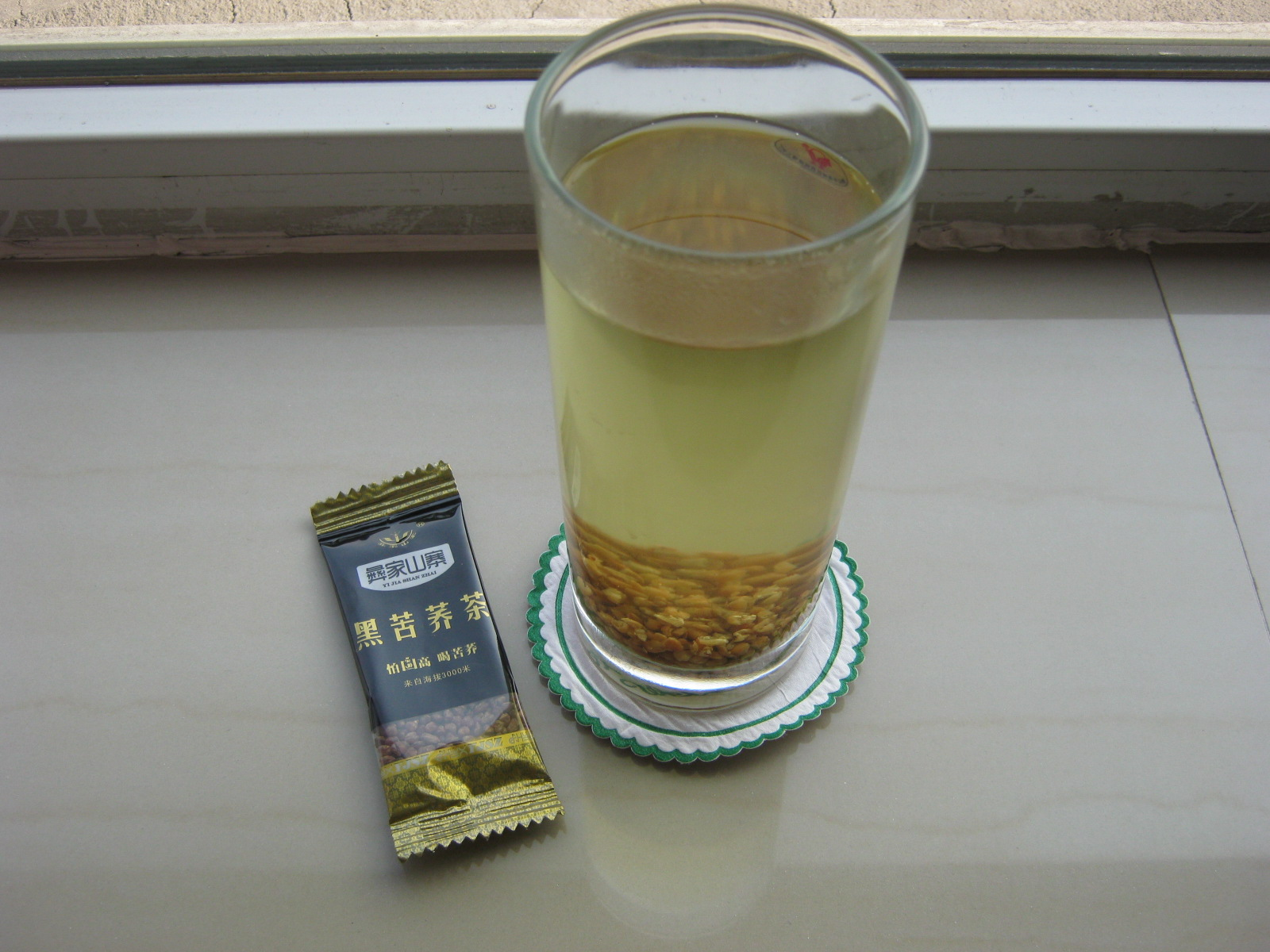
Black buckwheat tea (黑苦荞茶), Sichuan Province, China

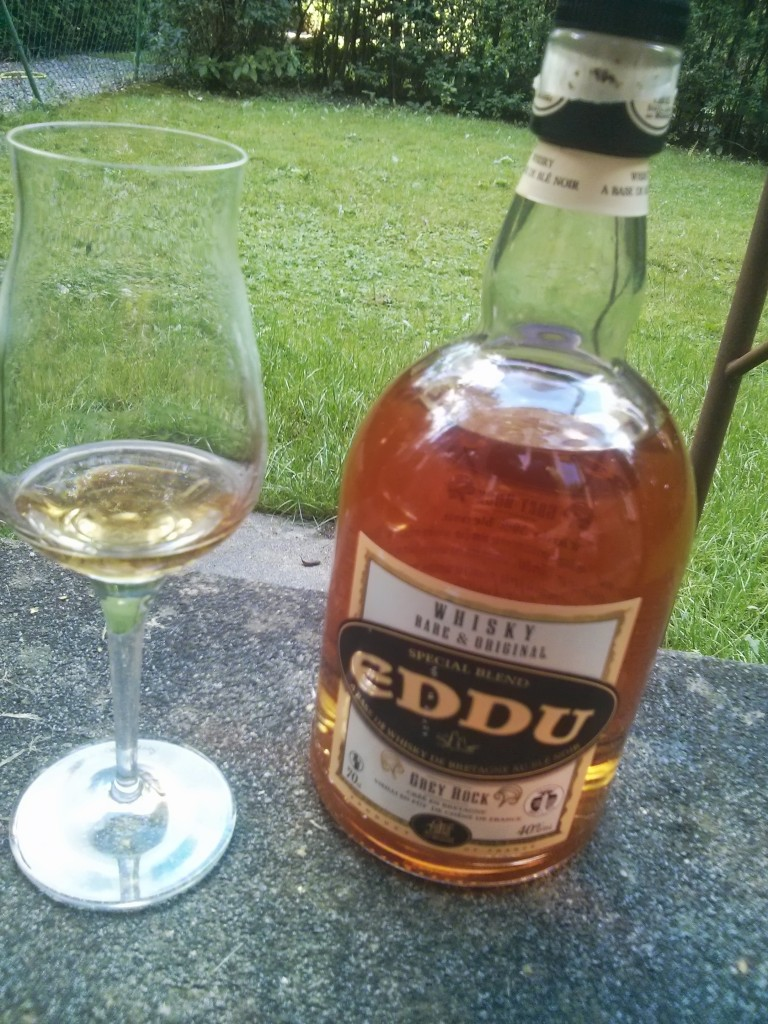
Buckwheat whisky from Distillerie des Menhirs

== Upholstery filling ==
Buckwheat hulls are used as filling for a variety of upholstered goods, including pillows. The hulls are durable and do not insulate or reflect heat as much as synthetic filling. They are sometimes marketed as an alternative natural filling to feathers for those allergic to feathers. However, medical studies to measure the health effects of pillows manufactured with unprocessed and uncleaned hulls concluded that such pillows contain higher levels of a potential allergen that may trigger asthma in susceptible individuals than do synthetic-filled pillows.

== See also ==
- List of buckwheat dishes
- Eriogonum – Genus of North American wild buckwheats
