= Minorities in Ukraine =

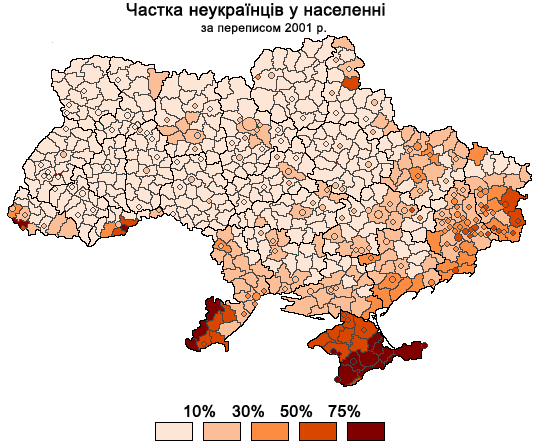
Map showing the proportion of non-Ukrainian minorities in Ukraine according to the 2001 census

Minorities in Ukraine form 22.2 percent of the country's population as of 2001. Large ethnic Russian (the largest ethnic minority in the country), Belarusian, Crimean Tatar, Bulgarian, Hungarian, and Romanian (including Moldovan) minorities exist in Ukraine, and Romania and Hungary have striven for the minority rights of the minorities they respectively represent. Ukraine also has a small number of Poles, Jews, Armenians, Roma and other nationalities.

Issues regarding minorities in Ukraine are, according to Financial Times, the biggest potential obstacle to the start of negotiations for the accession of Ukraine to the European Union. The former Prime Minister of Hungary Viktor Orbán threatened to veto Ukraine's process of EU accession numerous times over minority rights issues.

== Ethnic groups ==
The following table shows the number and percentage of the population belonging to major (above 5,000 people) ethnic minorities per the 2001 Ukrainian census.

Nationality	Number	Percentage
Russians	8,334,141	17.199%
Belarusians	275,763	0.569%
Moldovans^{1}	258,619	0.534%
Crimean Tatars	248,193	0.512%
Bulgarians	204,574	0.422%
Hungarians	156,566	0.323%
Romanians^{1}	150,989	0.312%
Poles	144,130	0.297%
Jews	103,591	0.214%
Armenians	99,894	0.206%
Greeks	91,548	0.189%
Tatars	73,304	0.151%
Romani	47,587	0.098%
Azerbaijanis	45,176	0.093%
Georgians	34,199	0.071%
Germans	33,302	0.069%
Gagauz	31,923	0.066%
Koreans	12,711	0.026%
Uzbeks	12,353	0.025%
Chuvash	10,593	0.022%
Mordvins^{2}	9,331	0.019%
Turks	8,844	0.018%
Lithuanians	7,207	0.015%
Arabs	6,575	0.014%
Slovaks	6,397	0.013%
Czechs	5,917	0.012%
Kazakhs	5,526	0.011%
Latvians	5,079	0.01%

^{1} There is an ethnolinguistic controversy whether Moldovans are the same as Romanians or a distinct ethnic group.
^{2} Erzyas and Mokshas

Other notable ethnic minorities are the Albanians, Austrians, Crimean Karaites, Krymchaks and Swedes (in Gammalsvenskby).

=== Sub-ethnic groups ===
The 2001 Ukrainian census listed seven sub-ethnic groups of Ukrainians: Boykos, Hutsuls, Lemkos, Litvins, Polishchuks, Rusyns, and Pinchuks, with nobody identifying as the latter at the time of the census. Other sub-groups of Ukrainians include the Batyuks, Bukovinians, Dolynians, Opolyans, Podolyans, Pokuttians, Siverians, Slobozhans, and Volhynians. Outside of Ukraine, the Rusyns are often recognized as a separate nationality.

Russian sub-ethnic groups in Ukraine are the Lipovans and Molokans, as well as the Goryuns, who self-identify as a separate ethnic group distinct from both Russians and Ukrainians, or as a mix of the two. Other such groups are the Crimean and Nadazovia Greeks; Carpathian, Crimean, Galician, Mennonite, Volhynian, and Zipser Germans; as well as Meskhetian Turks, Bessarabian Bulgarians, Hollenders and the Romanian-speaking Vlachs/Volokhs.

== Indigenous peoples of Ukraine ==
According to the 2021 law "On the Indigenous Peoples of Ukraine", the indigenous peoples of Ukraine are defined as ethnic minorities with distinctive languages, cultures, and representative bodies, that formed on the territory of Ukraine and do not have their own state entities outside of the country. The law lists the Crimean Tatars, Crimean Karaites and Krymchaks as such indigenous peoples of Crimea. There have been attempts to recognize other groups, such as the Gagauz and the Nadazovia Greeks, as indigenous.

== See also ==
- Languages of Ukraine
- Ukrainian diaspora
