= Nova Sloboda, Sumy Oblast =

Village in Sumy Oblast, Ukraine

Nova Sloboda Нова Слобода
- Village
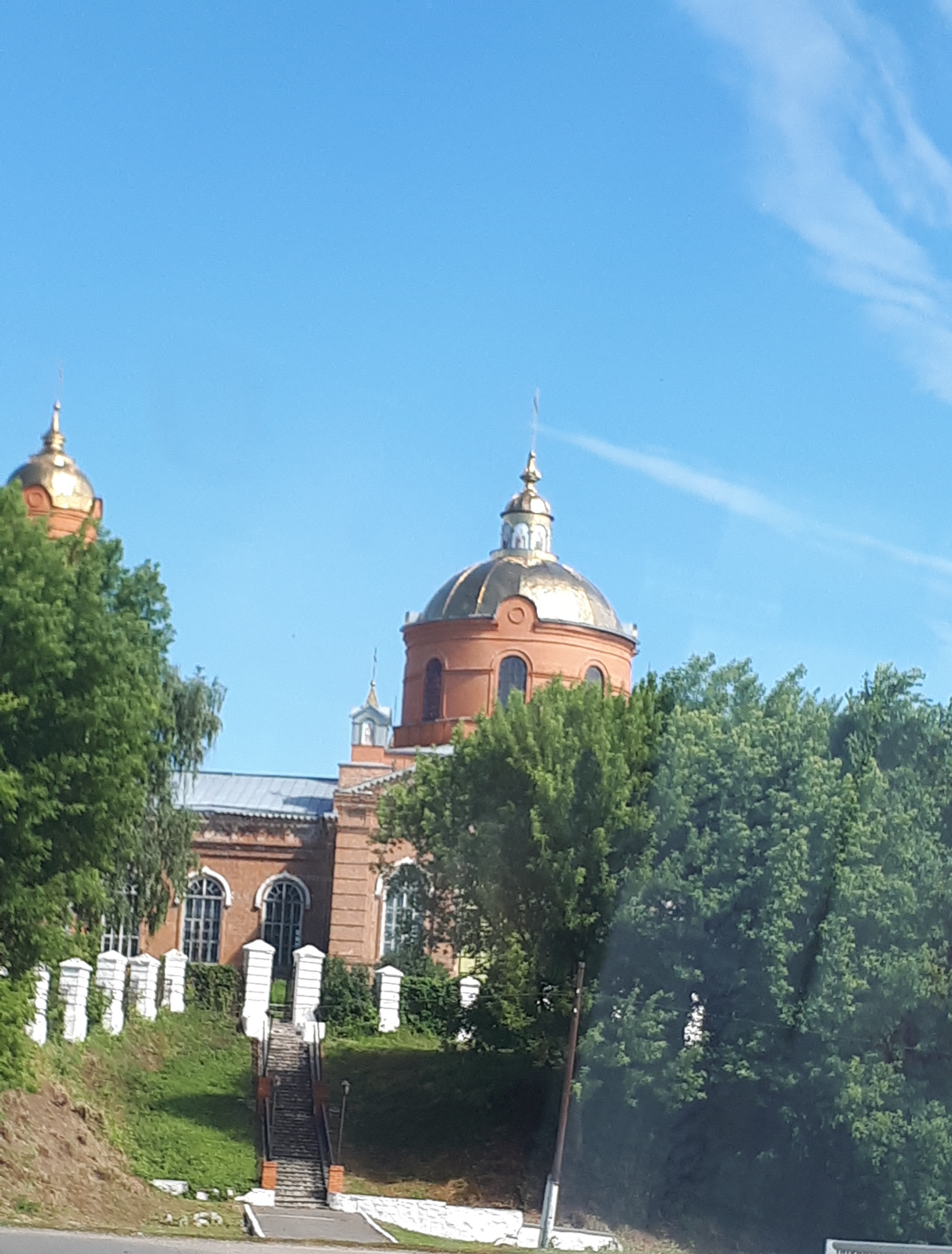
- Nicholas Church in Nova Sloboda
- Interactive map of Nova Sloboda
- Location of Nova Sloboda in Sumy Oblast Location of Nova Sloboda in Ukraine
- Coordinates: 51°22′25″N 34°07′34″E
- Country: Ukraine
- Oblast: Sumy Oblast
- Raion: Konotop Raion
- Hromada: Nova Sloboda rural hromada
- Established: 1593

Population
  - Total: 1,568

Nova Sloboda (Ukrainian: Нова Слобода; Russian: Новая Слобода, romanized: Novaya Sloboda) is a village in Ukraine, in Konotop Raion within the country's northern Sumy Oblast. It is the administrative centre of Nova Sloboda rural hromada, one of the hromadas of Ukraine. Its population is 300 (as of May 2025).

== History ==
Nova Sloboda was founded in 1593. In 1630 the Sophrony Monastery was founded in the village. In the present day, it is a men's monastery of the Ukrainian Orthodox Church (Moscow Patriarchate), and it was selected in 2007 as one of the three Wonders of Ukraine from Sumy Oblast.

On 7 July 1942 586 inhabitants of the village (including 70 children under the age of ten) were killed by Nazi Germany in retaliation for the village allegedly providing shelter to the Soviet partisans. The massacre has been compared by some, including the government of Sumy Oblast, to the Khatyn massacre in Belarus.

The Museum of Goryun Culture, dedicated to the Goryun ethnic group, was established in the village on 28 September 2017.

During the Russian invasion of Ukraine, Nova Sloboda was shelled by Russian forces throughout 2022 and 2023. Russians also launched an unsuccessful attempt to take the village from 23 April until the total Russian withdrawal after the end of the Northern Ukraine campaign. The same year, the Ministry of Agriculture, Nature and Food Quality of the Netherlands celebrated the village for its production of herbal teas, while the Institute of Partnership and Sustainable Development non-governmental organisation purchased a stock of teas to be supplied to internally displaced persons in Pokrovske. On May 13, 2025, a mandatory evacuation from the village was announced.

== Notable people ==
- Maksym Berlynskyi, Ukrainian historian
- Ivan Cherniakov, Ukrainian historian and archaeologist
- Lionel (Gudimov), Russian Orthodox Church archbishop of Donetsk and Sloviansk
- Mykola Kostrov, Ukrainian admiral
- Denis Podshivaylov, Soviet major general
- Mikhail Fyodorovich Popov, Russian physician and professor
