= Goryuns =

Ethnic group in Ukraine

Горюни
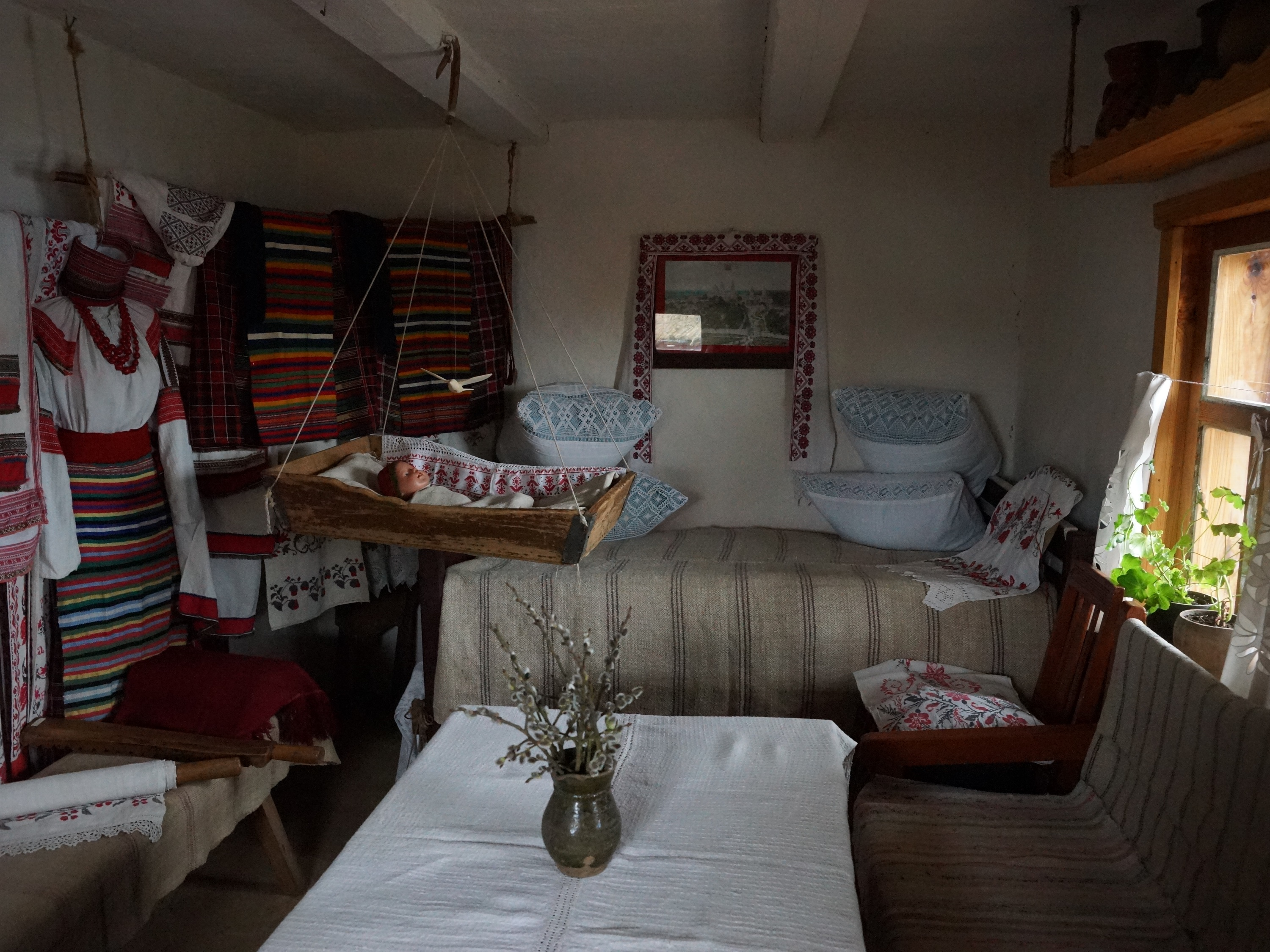
- Museum of Goryun Culture in Nova Sloboda, Sumy Oblast

Regions with significant populations
- Sumy Oblast, Ukraine (near Putyvl)

Languages
- Russian, Ukrainian

Related ethnic groups
- Belarusians, Russians, Ukrainians

Goryuns, also Horiuns or Horyuny (Ukrainian: горюни), a little-documented ethnic group of East Slavs living around Putyvl, now in the Sumy Oblast of north-eastern Ukraine, in the past in Kursk Governorate of the Russian Empire. The dialect of the Russian language spoken by Goryuns has some features of Belarusian and Ukrainian.

Goryuns are considered a tiny sub-ethnos of Russians. Regardless, they consider themselves as distinct from other Russians, as well as distinct from Ukrainians living in the same region.

Chronicles first mention Goryun villages in the sixteenth century, shortly after the annexation of the region to Muscovy. From this, the Belarusian scientist Fiodar Klimchuk concludes that the Goryuns might have lived in the region before the year 1500.

Different hypotheses address the origins of the Goriuns. James Stuart Olson describes them as an Ukrainianized subgroup of the Polekhs. According to Fiodar Klimchuk, the Goryuns may be descendants of local Severians or they might be of mixed Severian-Radimich stock, or their Severian ancestors might have moved to the north-west and then returned. Some researchers believe that they are autochthonous to the region and are related to the local early Slavic population; according to others, they descend from migrants from what is now Belarus — mixed with the local population.

Goryuns have a reputation for their unique style of polyphonic singing. In 2017, in the village of Nova Sloboda, a museum of Horyun culture was opened, the exposition of which recreates the estate of the Horyuns of the late nineteenth — early twentieth centuries.

== See also ==
- List of Medieval Slavic tribes
