= Podolyans =

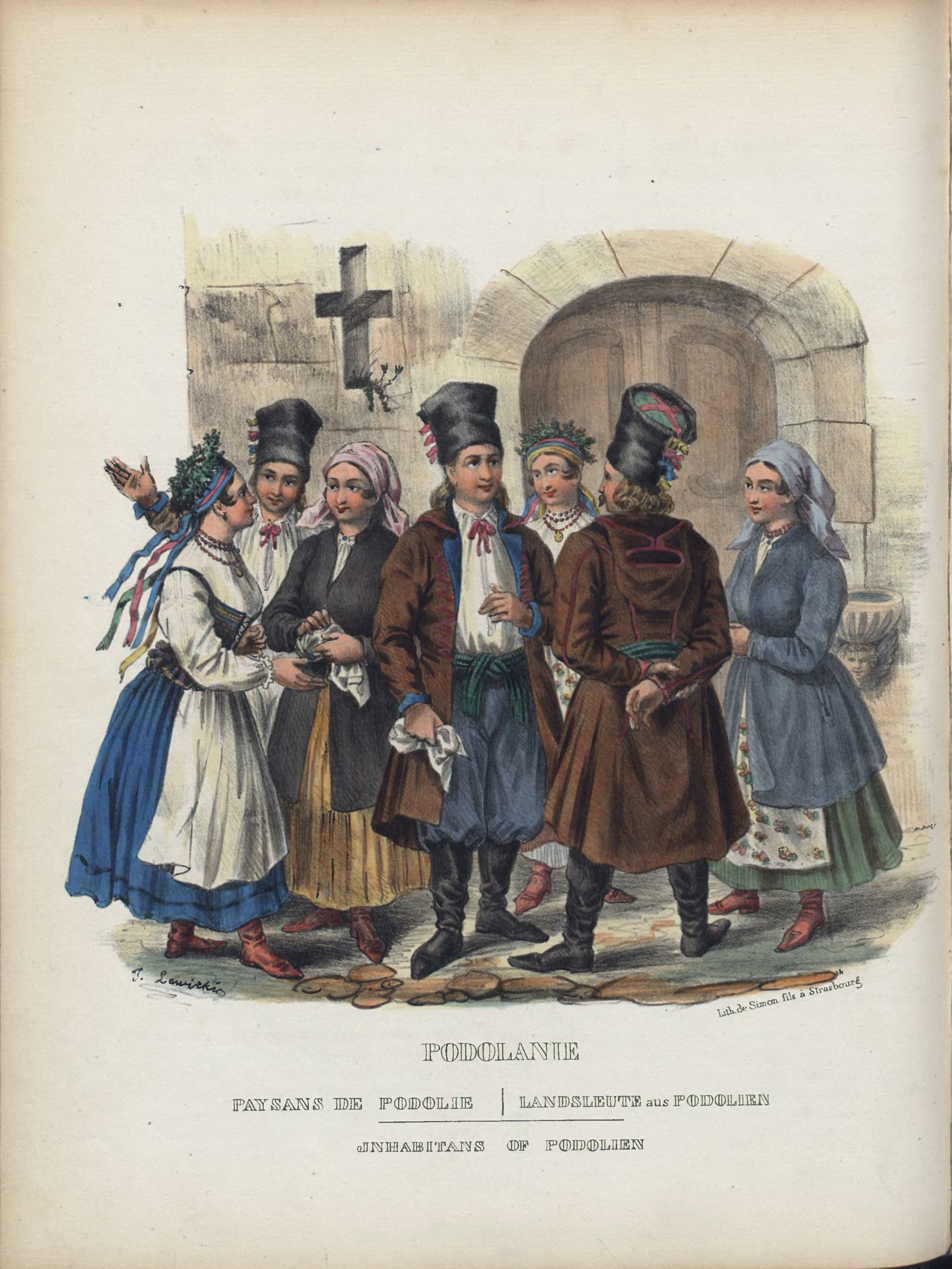
- Podolians, 1841

Regions with significant populations
- Ukraine: ?

Languages
- Podolian dialect of Ukrainian

Religion
- Christianity

Podolyans or Podolians (Ukrainian: Подоляни) are a Ukrainian ethnographic group who populate the region of Podolia.

In the 19th century, Gustave Le Bon has found them to extend as far West as Tatra Mountains, named "Podolians". (probably Podhalanie).

== Gallery ==
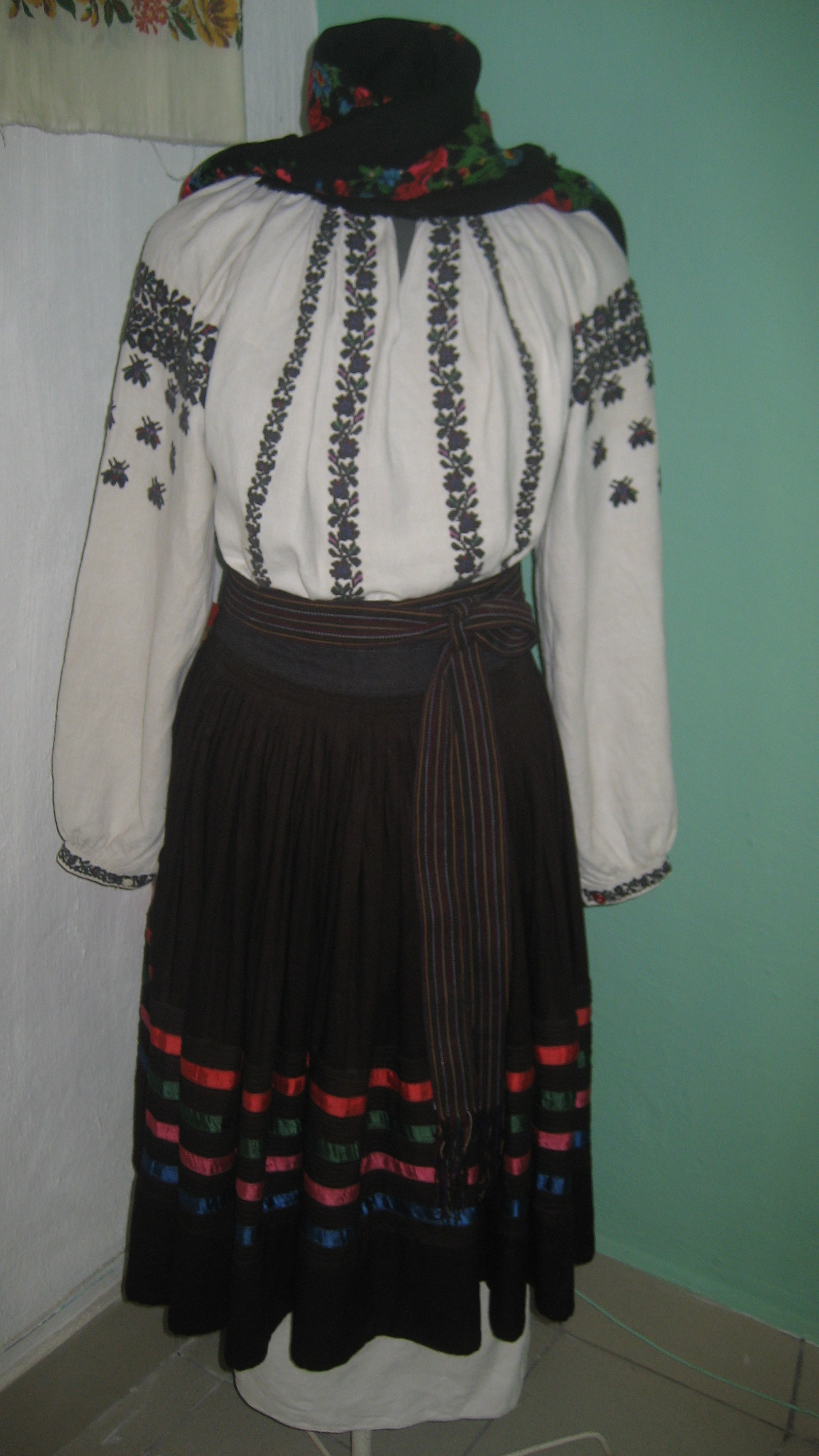
National costume of Podolia (Medzhybizh)

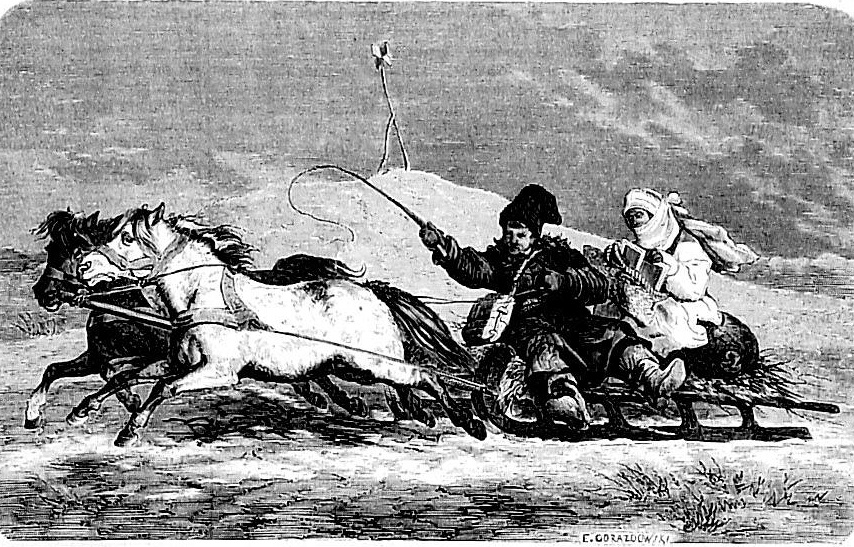
Podolyans from the fair, painting by Juliusz Kossak, 1864

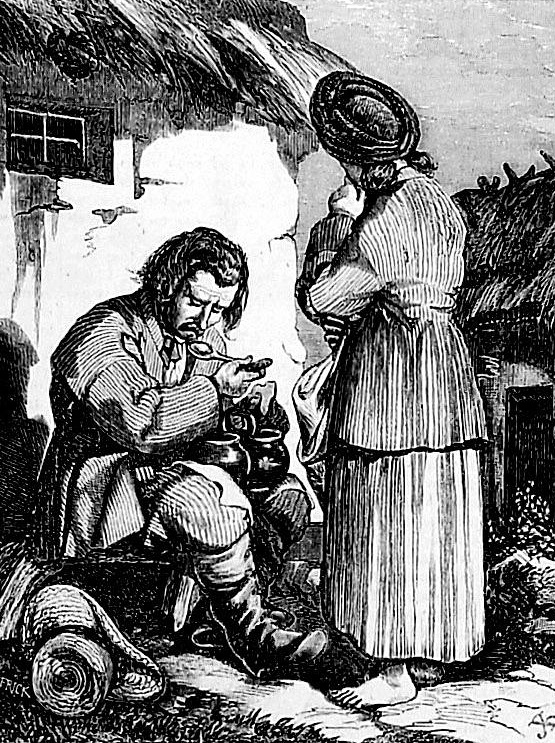
Podolyans, a lunch, painting by Juliusz Kossak, 1862

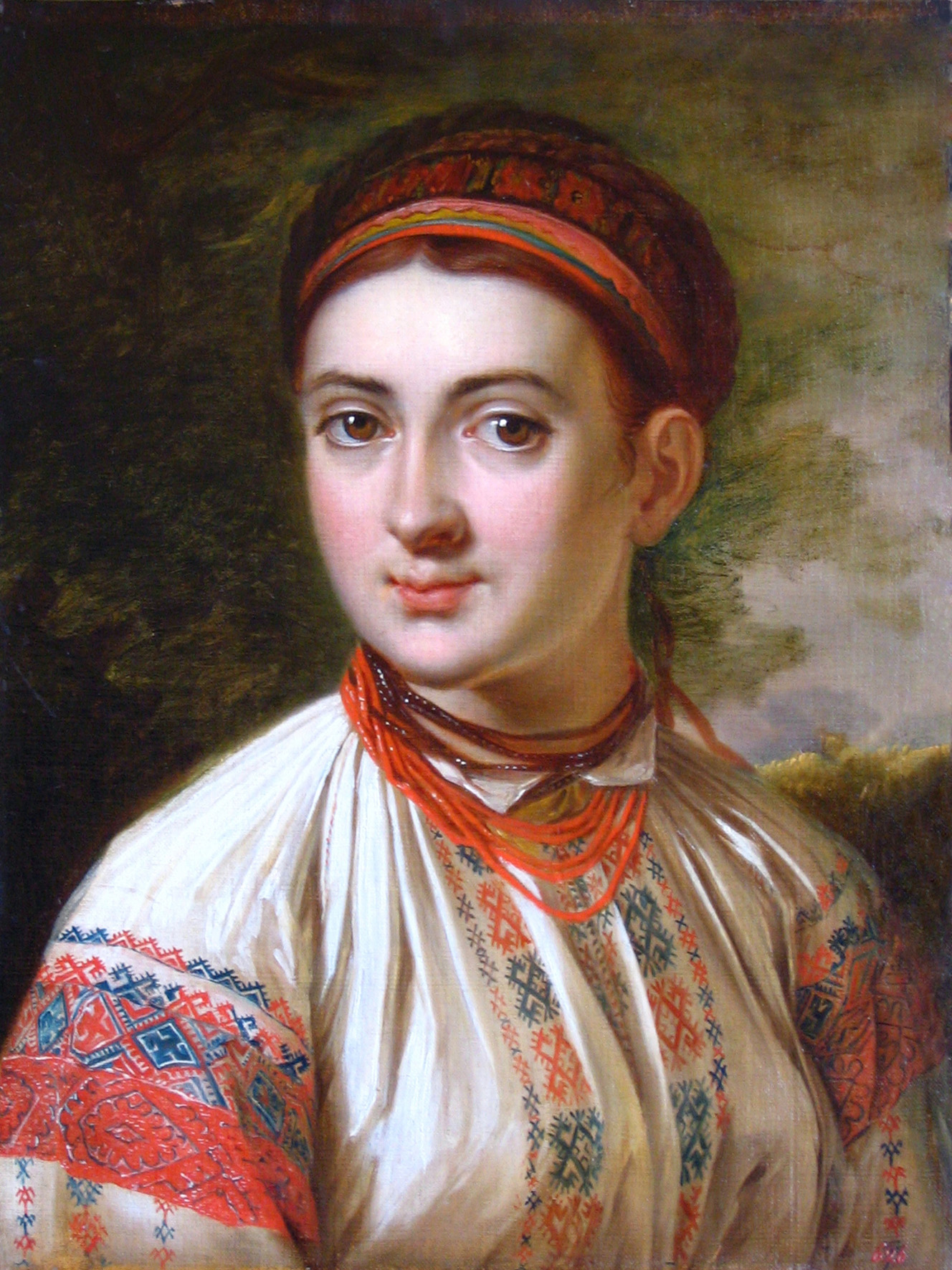
A lady from Podolia, painting by Vasily Tropinin

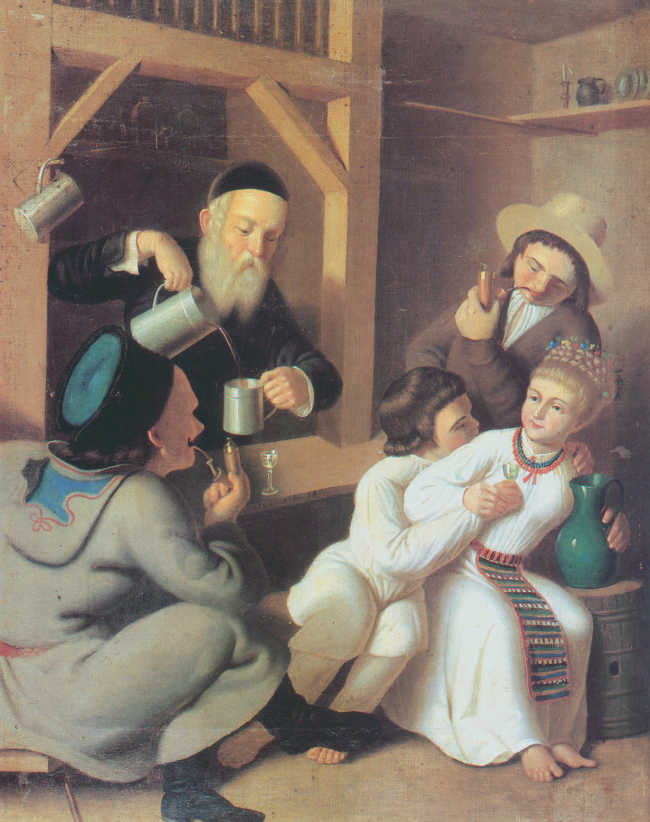
In tavern (korchma) in Podolia, painting by Jan Maszkowski

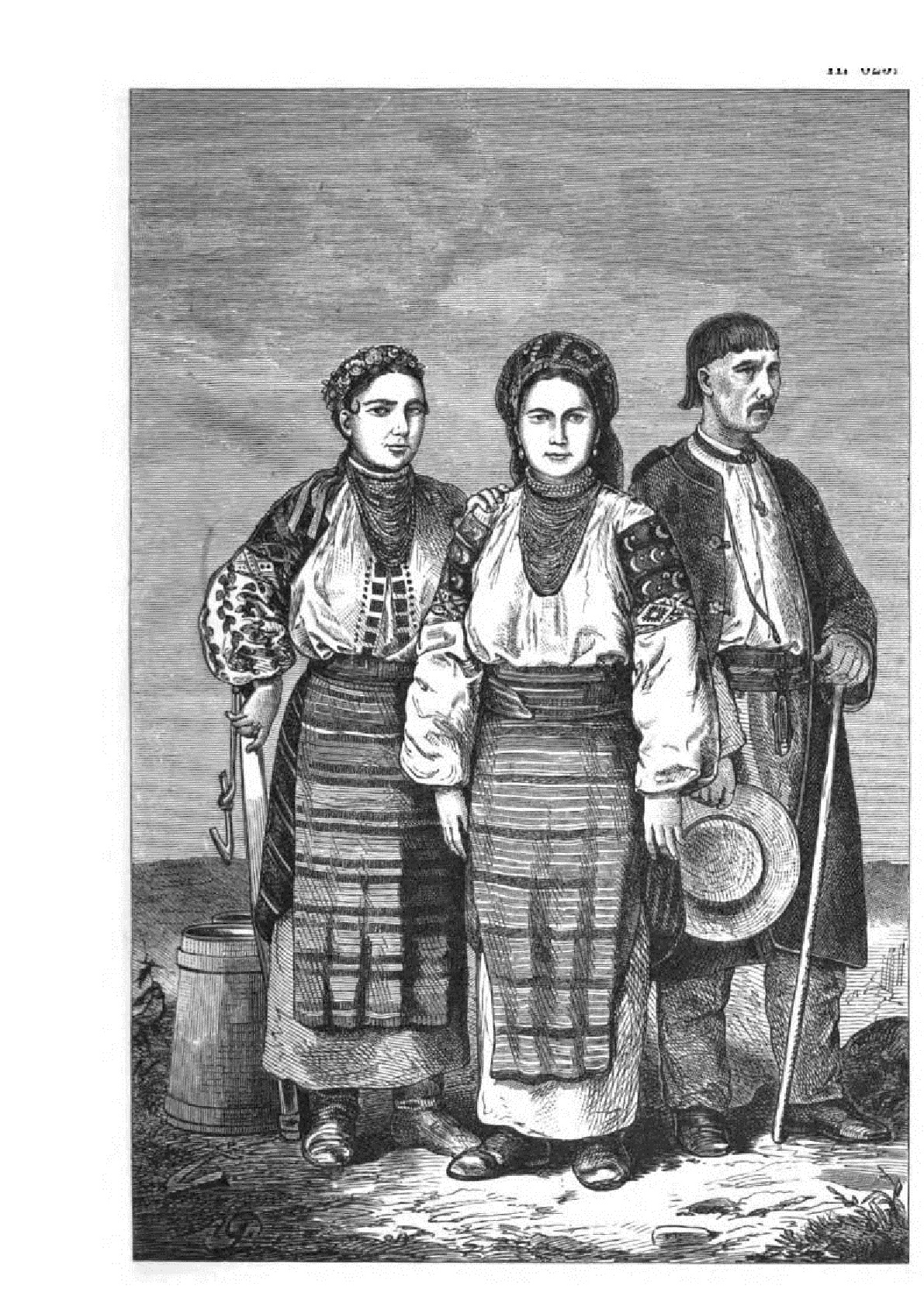
Podolians from Chortkiv county

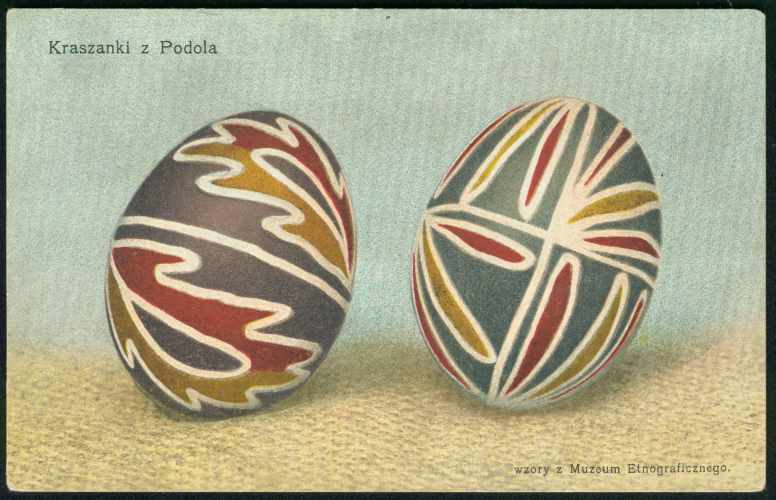
Pysanka from Podolia

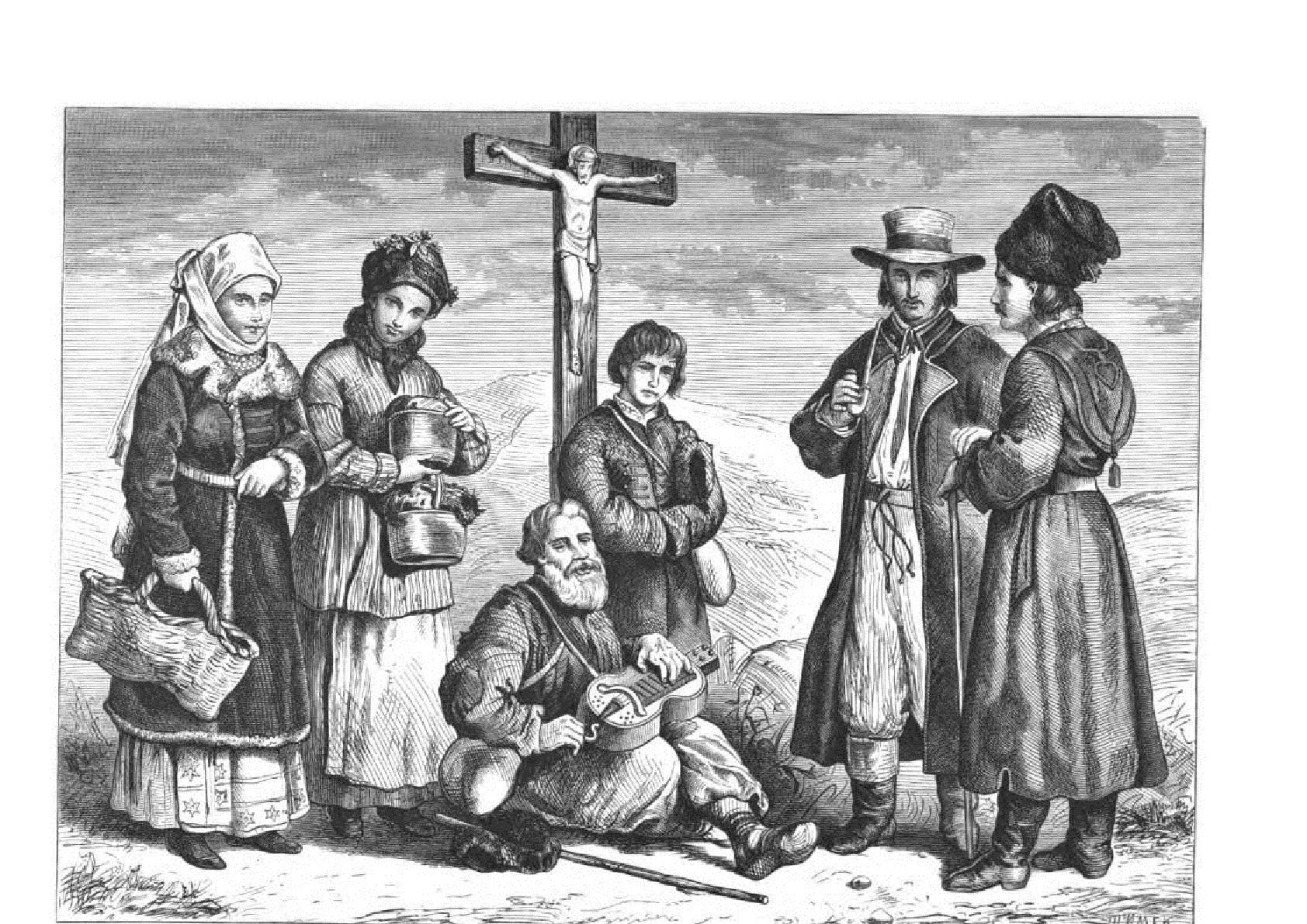
Podolians from Skalat, near Ternopil

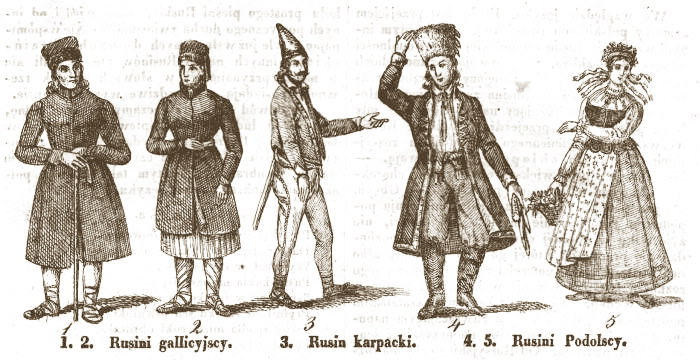
Rusyns of Carpathians, Halych, and Podolia

== See also ==
- Podolian dialect
- Dnipryans
- Volynians
