= Polekhs =

Ethnic subgroup of Russians

Polekhs (Russian: Полехи, romanized: Polekhi) are a subethnic group of Russians settled along the Desna River and Seym River and mixed with local populations of Belarusians and Lithuanians. Most of them retained the Russian Orthodox religion.

== See also ==
- Meshcheryaks
