= Russians =

East Slavic ethnic group

Русские

Total population
- c. 135 million

Regions with significant populations
- Russia 105,620,179 (2025)
- Diaspora
- Germany: approx. 7,500,000 (including Russian Jews and Russian Germans)
- Ukraine: 7,170,000 (2018) (including Crimea)
- United States: 3,072,756 (2009) (including Russian Jews and Russian Germans)
- Kazakhstan: 2,983,317 (2024 government est.)
- Uzbekistan: 720,324 (2019)
- Belarus: 706,992 (2019)
- Canada: 622,445 (2016) (Russian ancestry, excluding Russian Germans)
Other countries
Latvia	454,350 (2022)
Kyrgyzstan	352,960 (2018)
France	200,000 to 500,000
Estonia	315,252 (2021)
Argentina	300,000 (2018)
Moldova	201,218 (2014)
Brazil	200,000 (2018) (Russian citizens and Russian ancestry)
Turkmenistan	150,000 (2012)
Lithuania	129,797 (2017)
Italy	120,459
Azerbaijan	119,300 (2009)
Finland	90,801 (2020)
Spain	72,234 (2017)
Turkey	50,000–100,000 (2019)
Australia	67,055 (2006)
Egypt	50,000 (2007)
Poland	40,000 (2019)
Romania	36,397 (2002) (Lipovans)
Czech Republic	35,759 (2016)
Tajikistan	35,000 (2010)
South Korea	30,098 (2016)
Georgia	26,453 (2014)
Hungary	21,518 (2016)
Sweden	20,187 (2016)
China	15,609 (2000)
Bulgaria	15,595 (2002)
Armenia	14,076 (2022)
Greece	13,635 (2002)<
Serbia	10,486 (2021)
Denmark	10,447 (2025)
Slovakia	8,116 (2021)
New Zealand	5,979 (2013)<

Languages
- Russian, Russian Sign Language

Religion
- Predominantly Eastern Orthodoxy (Russian Orthodoxy), minority irreligion

Related ethnic groups
- Other East Slavs (Belarusians, Ukrainians, Rusyns)

Russians (Russian: русские, romanized: russkiye [ˈruskʲɪje]) are an East Slavic ethnic group native to Eastern Europe. Their mother tongue is Russian, the most spoken Slavic language. The majority of Russians adhere to Orthodox Christianity, ever since the Middle Ages. By total numbers, they compose the largest Slavic and European nation.

Genetic studies show that Russians are closely related to Belarusians and Ukrainians as well as to other neighbouring European ethnic groups to a lesser extent. They were formed from East Slavic tribes, and their cultural ancestry is based in Kievan Rus'. The Russian word for the Russians is derived from the people of Rus' and the territory of Rus'. Russians share many historical and cultural traits with other European peoples, and especially with other East Slavic ethnic groups, specifically Belarusians and Ukrainians.

The vast majority of Russians live in native Russia, but notable minorities are scattered throughout other post-Soviet states such as Belarus, Kazakhstan, Moldova, Ukraine, and the Baltic states. A large Russian diaspora (sometimes including Russian-speaking non-Russians), estimated at 25 million people, has developed all over the world, with notable numbers in the United States, Germany, Brazil, and Canada.

== Ethnonym ==
There are two Russian words which are commonly translated into English as "Russians". One is русские (russkiye), which in modern Russia most often means "ethnic Russians". The other one is россияне (rossiyane), derived from Россия (Rossiya, Russia), which denotes "people of Russia", regardless of ethnicity or religious affiliation. In daily usage, those terms are often mixed up, and since Vladimir Putin became president, the ethnic term русские has supplanted the non-ethnic term.

The name of the Russians derives from the early medieval Rus' people, a group of Norse merchants and warriors who relocated from across the Baltic Sea and played an important part in the foundation of the first East Slavic state that later became the Kievan Rus'.

The idea of a single "all-Russian nation" encompassing the East Slavic peoples, or a "triune nation" of three brotherly "Great Russian", "Little Russian" (i.e. Ukrainian), and "White Russian" (i.e. Belarusian) peoples became the official doctrine of the Russian Empire from the beginning of the 19th century onwards.

== History ==
=== Ancient history ===
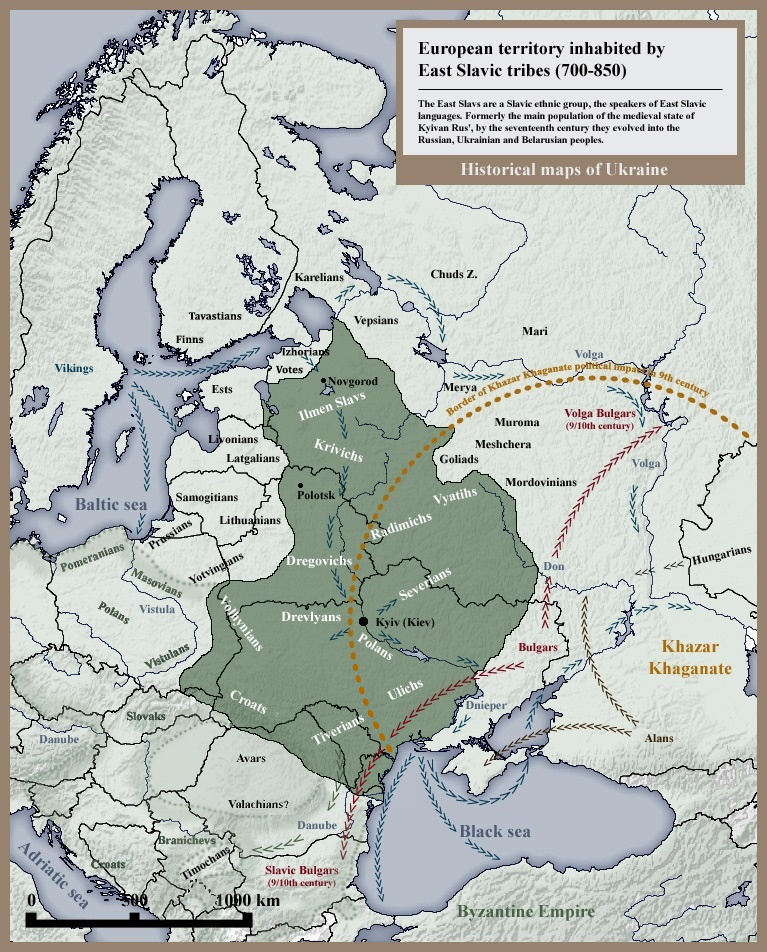
East Slavic tribes and peoples, 8th–9th century

The ancestors of modern Russians are the Slavic tribes, whose original home is thought by some scholars to have been the wooded areas of the Pinsk Marshes, one of the largest wetlands in Europe. The East Slavs gradually settled Western Russia with Moscow included in two waves: one moving from Kiev toward present-day Suzdal and Murom and another from Polotsk toward Novgorod and Rostov. Prior to the Slavic migration in the 6-7th centuries, the Suzdal-Murom and Novgorod-Rostov areas were populated by Finnic peoples, including the Merya, the Muromians, and the Meshchera.

From the 7th century onwards, the East Slavs slowly assimilated the native Finnic peoples, so that by year 1100, the majority of the population in Western Russia was Slavic-speaking. Recent genetic studies confirm the presence of a Finnic substrate in modern Russian population.

Outside archaeological remains, little is known about the predecessors to Russians in general prior to 859 AD, when the Primary Chronicle starts its records. By 600 AD, the Slavs are believed to have split linguistically into southern, western, and eastern branches.

=== Medieval history ===
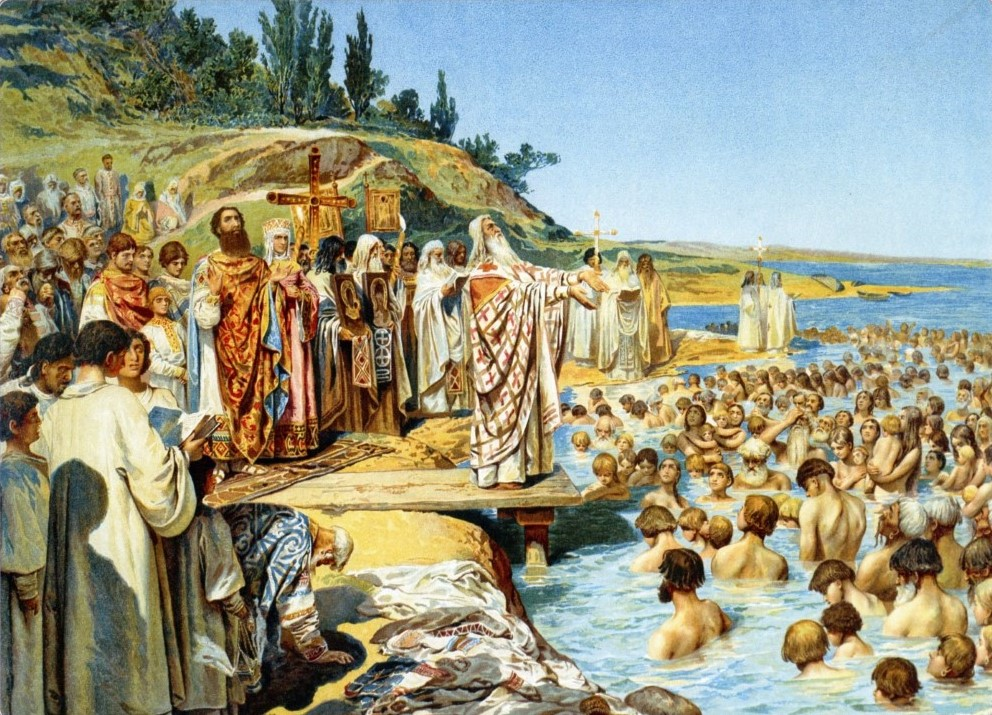
The Baptism of Kievans, by Klavdy Lebedev

The Rus' state was established in northern Russia in the year 862, which was ruled by the Varangians. Staraya Ladoga and Novgorod became the first major cities of the new union of immigrants from Scandinavia with the Slavs and Finns. In 882, the prince Oleg seized Kiev, thereby uniting the northern and southern lands of the East Slavs under one authority. The state adopted Christianity from the Byzantine Empire in 988. Kievan Rus' ultimately disintegrated as a state as a result of in-fighting between members of the princely family that ruled it collectively.

After the 13th century, Moscow became a political and cultural center. Moscow has become a center for the unification of Russian lands. By the end of the 15th century, Moscow united the northeastern and northwestern Russian principalities, overthrew the "Mongol yoke" in 1480, and would be transformed into the Tsardom of Russia after Ivan IV was crowned tsar in 1547.

=== Modern history ===
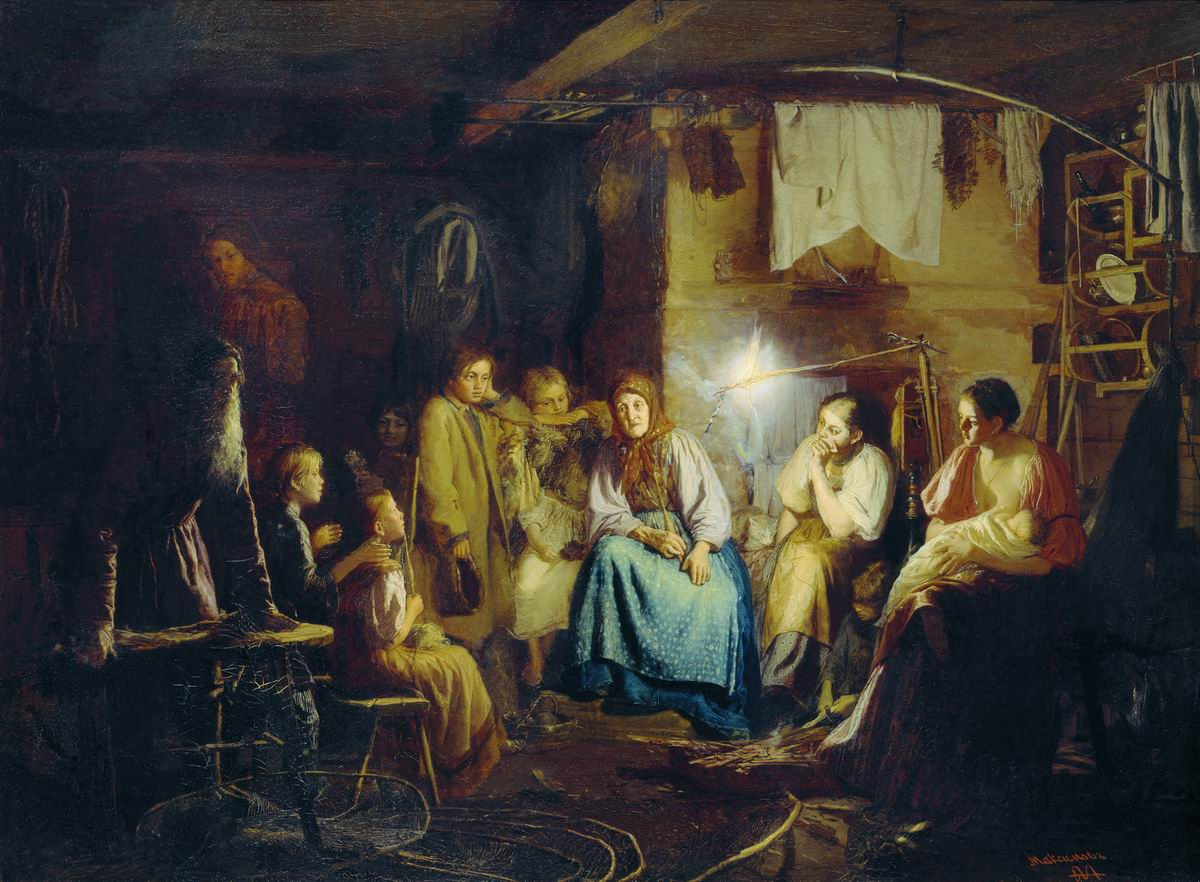
Grandma's Fairy Tales, by Vassily Maximov

In 1721, Tsar Peter the Great renamed his state as the Russian Empire, hoping to associate it with historical and cultural achievements of ancient Rus' – in contrast to his policies oriented towards Western Europe. The state now extended from the eastern borders of the Polish–Lithuanian Commonwealth to the Pacific Ocean, and became a great power; and one of the most powerful states in Europe after the victory over Napoleon. Peasant revolts were common, and all were fiercely suppressed. The Emperor Alexander II abolished Russian serfdom in 1861, but the peasants fared poorly and revolutionary pressures grew. In the following decades, reform efforts such as the Stolypin reforms of 1906–1914, the constitution of 1906, and the State Duma (1906–1917) attempted to open and liberalize the economy and political system, but the Emperors refused to relinquish autocratic rule and resisted sharing their power.

Percentage of ethnic Russians by federal subjects of Russia according to the 2010 census: above 80%

A combination of economic breakdown, war-weariness, and discontent with the autocratic system of government triggered revolution in Russia in 1917. The overthrow of the monarchy initially brought into office a coalition of liberals and moderate socialists, but their failed policies led to seizure of power by the communist Bolsheviks on 25 October 1917 (7 November New Style). In 1922, Soviet Russia, along with Soviet Ukraine, Soviet Belarus, and the Transcaucasian SFSR signed the Treaty on the Creation of the USSR, officially merging all four republics to form the Soviet Union as a country. Between 1922 and 1991, the history of Russia became essentially the history of the Soviet Union, effectively an ideologically based state roughly conterminous with the Russian Empire before the 1918 Treaty of Brest-Litovsk. From its first years, government in the Soviet Union based itself on the one-party rule of the Communists, as the Bolsheviks called themselves, beginning in March 1918. The approach to the building of socialism, however, varied over different periods in Soviet history: from the mixed economy and diverse society and culture of the 1920s through the command economy and repressions of the Joseph Stalin era to the "era of stagnation" from the 1960s to the 1980s. The actions of the Soviet government caused the death of millions of citizens in the famine of 1930–1933 and the Great Purge. The attack by Nazi Germany and the ensuing war, together with the Holocaust, again claimed millions of lives. Millions of Russian civilians and prisoners of war were killed or starved to death during Nazi Germany's genocidal policies called the Hunger Plan and the Generalplan Ost, including one million civilian casualties during the Siege of Leningrad. After the victory of the Soviet Union and the Western Allies, the Soviet Union became a superpower opposing Western countries during the Cold War.

By the mid-1980s, with Soviet economic and political weaknesses becoming acute, Soviet leader Mikhail Gorbachev embarked on major reforms; these culminated in the dissolution of the Soviet Union, leaving Russia again alone and marking the beginning of the post-Soviet Russian period. The Russian Soviet Federative Socialist Republic renamed itself the Russian Federation and became the successor state to the Soviet Union. One of the negative consequences of the collapse of the Soviet Union was the problem of discrimination against the 25 million ethnic Russians living in a number of post-Soviet states.

== Geographic distribution ==
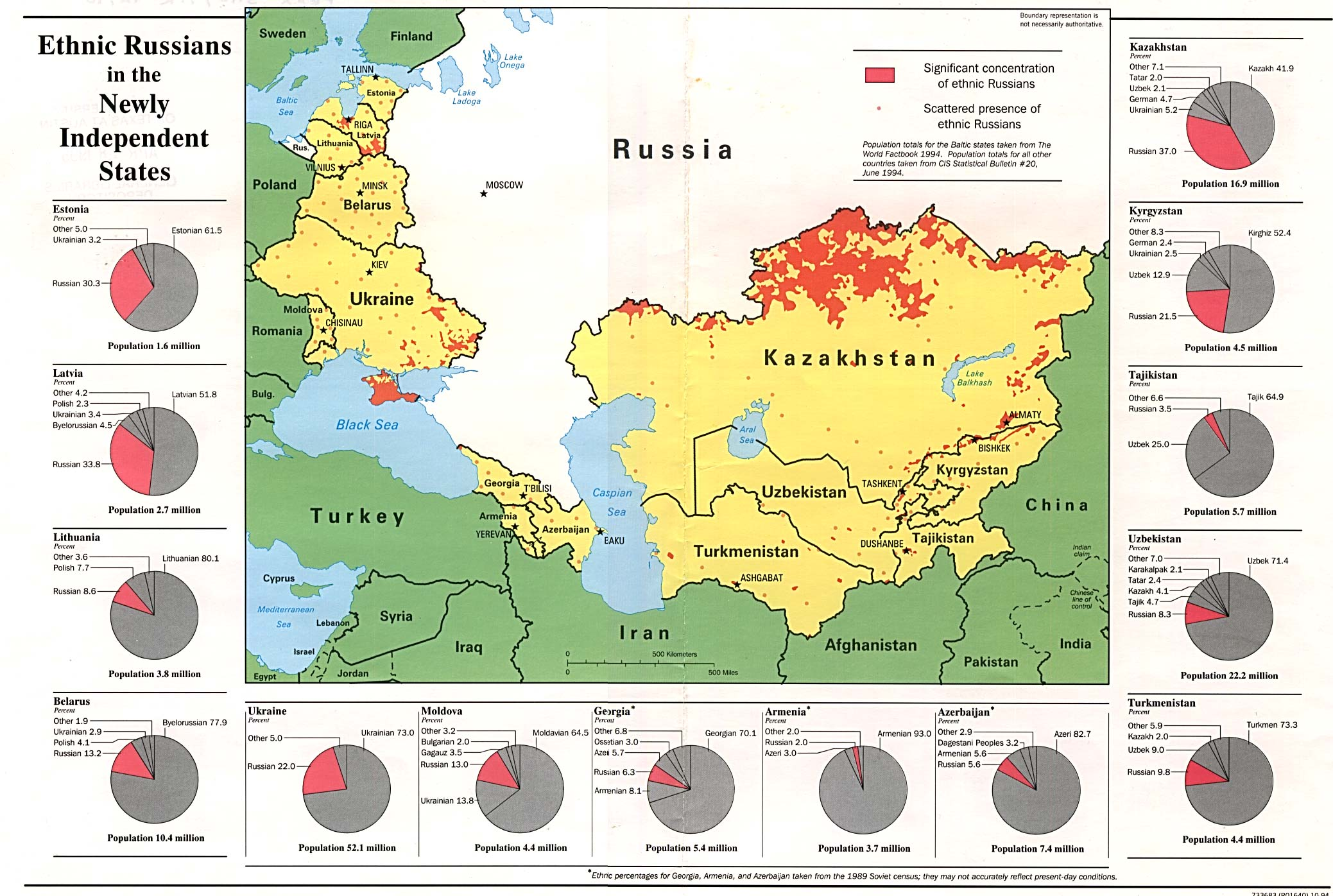
Ethnic Russians in former Soviet Union states in 1994

Ethnic Russians historically migrated within the areas of the former Russian Empire and Soviet Union, though they were sometimes encouraged to re-settle in borderland areas by the Tsarist and later Soviet government. Sometimes ethnic Russian communities, such as the Lipovans who settled in the Danube Delta or the Doukhobors in Canada, emigrated as religious dissidents fleeing the central authority.

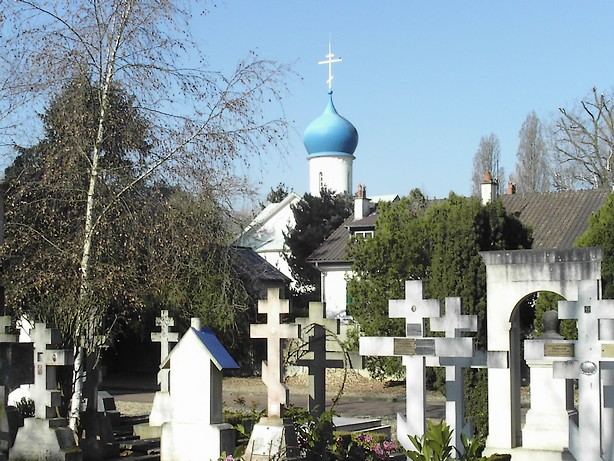
Sainte-Geneviève-des-Bois Russian Cemetery in Paris, the resting place of many eminent Russian émigrés after 1917

There are also small Russian communities in the Balkans — including Lipovans in the Danube delta — Central European nations such as Germany and Poland, as well as Russians settled in China, Japan, South Korea, Mexico, Brazil, Argentina and Australia. These communities identify themselves to varying degrees as Russians, citizens of these countries, or both.

Significant numbers of Russians emigrated to Canada, Australia and the United States. Brighton Beach, Brooklyn and South Beach, Staten Island in New York City are examples of large communities of recent Russian and Russian-Jewish immigrants. Other examples are Sunny Isles Beach, a northern suburb of Miami, and West Hollywood of the Los Angeles area.

After the Russian Revolution in 1917, many Russians who were identified with the White army moved to China — most of them settling in Harbin and Shanghai. By the 1930s, Harbin had 100,000 Russians. Many of these Russians moved back to the Soviet Union after World War II. Today, a large group in northern China still speak Russian as a second language. Russians (eluosizu) are one of the 56 ethnic groups officially recognized by the People's Republic of China (as the Russ); there are approximately 15,600 Russian Chinese living mostly in northern Xinjiang, and also in Inner Mongolia and Heilongjiang.

According to the 2021 Russian census, the number of ethnic Russians in the Russian Federation decreased by nearly 5.43 million, from roughly 111 million people in 2010 to approximately 105.5 million in 2021.

== Ethnographic groups ==
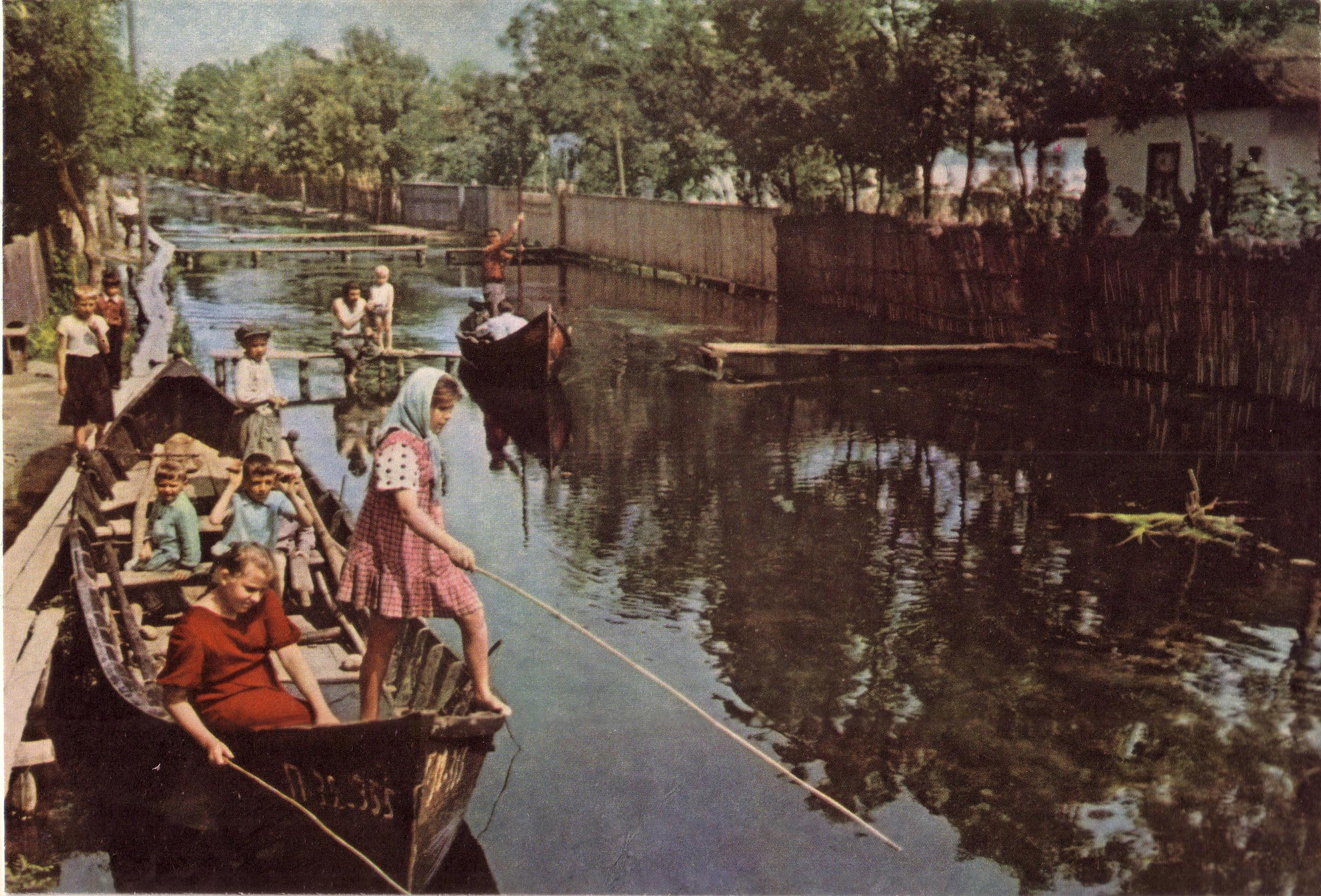
Lipovans in the Danube Delta

Among Russians, a number of ethnographic groups stand out, such as: the Northern Russians, the Southern Russians, the Cossacks, the Goryuns, the Kamchadals, the Polekhs, the Pomors, the Russian Chinese, the Siberians (Siberiaks), Starozhily, some groupings of Old Believers (Kamenschiks, Lipovans, Semeiskie), and others.

The main ones are the Northern and Southern Russian groups. At the same time, the proposal of the ethnographer Dmitry Zelenin in his major work of 1927 Russian (East Slavic) Ethnography to consider them as separate East Slavic peoples did not find support in scientific circles.

Russia's Arctic coastline had been explored and settled by Pomors, Russian settlers from Novgorod.

Cossacks inhabited sparsely populated areas in the Don, Terek, and Ural river basins, and played an important role in the historical and cultural development of parts of Russia.

== Genetics ==
In accordance with the 2008 research results of Russian and Estonian geneticists, two groups of Russians are distinguished: the northern and southern populations.

Central and Southern Russians, to which the majority of Russian populations belong, according to Y chromosome R1a, are included in the general "East European" gene cluster with the rest East and West Slavs (Poles, Czechs and Slovaks), as well as the non-Slavic Hungarians and Aromanians. Genetically, East Slavs are quite similar to West Slavs; such genetic similarity is somewhat unusual for genetics with such a wide settlement of the Slavs, especially Russians. Northern Russians, according to mtDNA, Y chromosome and autosomal marker CCR5de132, are included in the "North European" gene cluster (the Poles, the Balts, Germanic and Baltic Finnic peoples). On top of their closeness to other Slavic peoples, Russians are found to share a significant part of their DNA with speakers of Finno-Ugric languages inhabiting present-day Russia, which indicates a likely scenario of genetic admixture with indigenous populations. A common origin for all peoples of the Nordic gene pool has been hypothesised, with descendants of a Paleo-European population having remained around the Baltic Sea.

At the same time, according to other scholars, the Russians have close genetic affinities to surrounding Northeast and Eastern European populations. They also display evidence for multiple genetic ancestries and admixture events, and high identity-by-descent sharing with the Finnic peoples.

While modern European populations derive most of their ancestry from three major sources: Western hunter-gatherers, Early European Farmers, and Western Steppe Herders (Yamnaya), this three-way model is insufficient to explain the ethnogenesis of populations from north-eastern Europe such as Saami, Russians, Mordovians, Chuvash, Estonians, Hungarians, and Finns. They carry an additional Siberian/Nganasan-related genetic component and increased allele sharing with modern East Asians.

The most common human Y-chromosome DNA haplogroup is haplogroup R1a (c. 46,7%), followed by haplogroup N-M231 (c. 21,6%), haplogroup I-M170 (c. 17,6%), and haplogroup R1b (c. 5,8%). The remainder (c. 8,3%) are other less frequent haplogroups (E3b, J2, etc.).

== Assimilation and immigration ==
Russians have sometimes found it useful to emphasize their self-perceived ability to assimilate other people to the Russian ethnicity - and as a historic great power with imperial expansionist tendencies the Russian state has sometimes encouraged Russian-centred monoculturalism. Steppe peoples, Tatars, Baltic Germans, Lithuanians and native Siberians in Rus', Muscovy or the Russian Empire could in theory become "Russians" (Russian: русские) simply by accepting Russian Orthodoxy as their faith. The attitude of ready inclusivity is summed up in the popular phrase (sometimes attributed to Emperor Alexander III of Russia) - Хочешь быть русским - будь им! (transl. You want to be Russian - be that!).

== Language ==
Russian is the official and the predominantly spoken language in Russia. It is the most-spoken native language in Europe, the most geographically widespread language of Eurasia, as well as the world's most widely spoken Slavic language. Russian is the third-most used language on the Internet after English and Spanish, and is one of two official languages aboard the International Space Station, as well as one of the six official languages of the United Nations.

== Culture ==
=== Literature ===
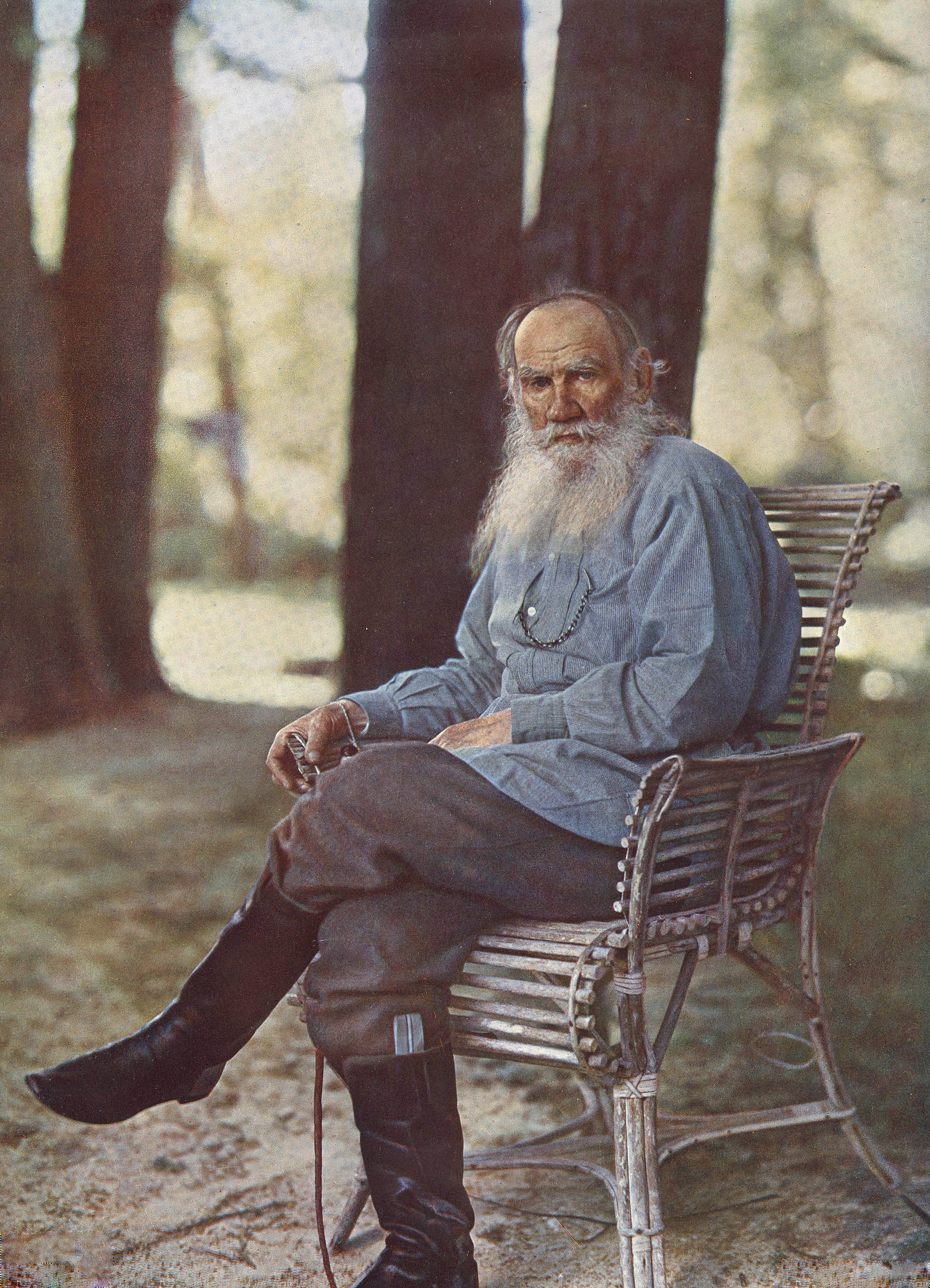
Leo Tolstoy's (1828–1910) notable works include the novels War and Peace and Anna Karenina, often cited as pinnacles of realist fiction.

Russian literature is considered to be among the world's most influential and developed. It can be traced to the Middle Ages, when epics and chronicles in vernacular Old East Slavic were composed. By the Age of Enlightenment, literature had grown in importance, with works from Mikhail Lomonosov, Denis Fonvizin, Gavrila Derzhavin, and the Sentimentalist Nikolay Karamzin. From the early 1830s, during the Golden Age of Russian Poetry, literature underwent an astounding golden age in poetry, prose and drama. Romantic literature permitted a flowering of poetic talent: Vasily Zhukovsky and later his protégé Alexander Pushkin came to the fore. Following Pushkin's footsteps, a new generation of poets were born, including Mikhail Lermontov, Nikolay Nekrasov, Aleksey Konstantinovich Tolstoy, Fyodor Tyutchev and Afanasy Fet.

The first great Russian novelist was Nikolai Gogol. Then, during the Age of Realism, came Ivan Turgenev, who mastered both short stories and novels. Fyodor Dostoevsky and Leo Tolstoy soon became internationally renowned. Ivan Goncharov is remembered mainly for his novel Oblomov. Mikhail Saltykov-Shchedrin wrote prose satire, while Nikolai Leskov is best remembered for his shorter fiction. In the second half of the century Anton Chekhov excelled in short stories and became a leading dramatist. Other important 19th-century developments included the fabulist Ivan Krylov, non-fiction writers such as the critic Vissarion Belinsky, and playwrights such as Aleksandr Griboyedov and Aleksandr Ostrovsky. The beginning of the 20th century ranks as the Silver Age of Russian Poetry. This era had poets such as Alexander Blok, Anna Akhmatova, Boris Pasternak, Konstantin Balmont, Marina Tsvetaeva, Vladimir Mayakovsky, and Osip Mandelstam. It also produced some first-rate novelists and short-story writers, such as Aleksandr Kuprin, Nobel Prize winner Ivan Bunin, Leonid Andreyev, Yevgeny Zamyatin, Dmitry Merezhkovsky and Andrei Bely.

After the Russian Revolution of 1917, Russian literature split into Soviet and white émigré parts. In the 1930s, Socialist realism became the predominant trend in Russia. Its leading figure was Maxim Gorky, who laid the foundations of this style. Mikhail Bulgakov was one of the leading writers of the Soviet era. Nikolay Ostrovsky's novel How the Steel Was Tempered has been among the most successful works of Russian literature. Influential émigré writers include Vladimir Nabokov. Some writers dared to oppose Soviet ideology, such as Nobel Prize-winning novelist Aleksandr Solzhenitsyn, who wrote about life in the Gulag camps.

During the post-Soviet 1990s writers are already not recognised as very special guides by most Russians. At the beginning of the 21st century, the most discussed figures, postmodernists Victor Pelevin and Vladimir Sorokin remained the leading Russian writers.

=== Philosophy ===
Russian philosophy has been greatly influential. Religious and spiritual philosophy is represented by works of Vladimir Solovyov, Nikolai Berdyaev, Pavel Florensky, Semyon Frank, Nikolay Lossky, Vasily Rozanov, and others. Helena Blavatsky gained international following as the leading theoretician of Theosophy, and co-founded the Theosophical Society.

Social and political philosophy is also remarkable. Alexander Herzen is known as one of the fathers of agrarian populism. Mikhail Bakunin is referred to as the father of anarchism. Peter Kropotkin was the most important theorist of anarcho-communism. Mikhail Bakhtin's writings have significantly inspired scholars. Vladimir Lenin, a major revolutionary, developed a variant of communism known as Leninism. Leon Trotsky, on the other hand, founded Trotskyism. Alexander Zinoviev was a prominent philosopher and writer in the second half of the 20th century. Aleksandr Dugin, known for his fascist views, has been regarded as the "guru of geopolitics".

=== Science ===
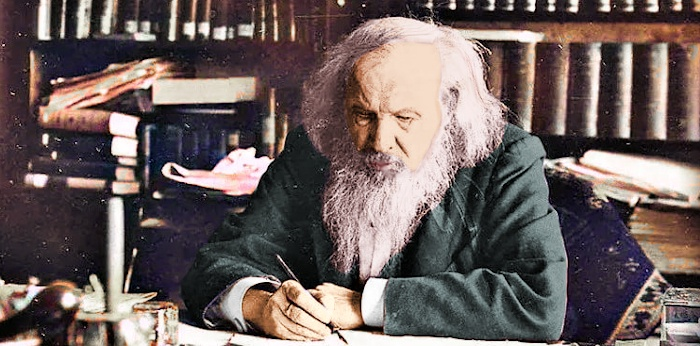
Dmitri Mendeleev (1837–1906) is best known for formulating the Periodic Law and creating a version of the periodic table of elements.

Mikhail Lomonosov proposed the conservation of mass in chemical reactions, discovered the atmosphere of Venus, and founded modern geology. Since the times of Nikolay Lobachevsky, who pioneered the non-Euclidean geometry, and a prominent tutor Pafnuty Chebyshev, Russian mathematicians became among the world's most influential. Dmitry Mendeleev invented the Periodic table, the main framework of modern chemistry. Sofya Kovalevskaya was a pioneer among women in mathematics in the 19th century. Grigori Perelman was offered the first ever Clay Millennium Prize Problems Award for his final proof of the Poincaré conjecture in 2002, as well as the Fields Medal in 2006, both of which he declined.

Alexander Popov was among the inventors of radio, while Nikolai Basov and Alexander Prokhorov were co-inventors of laser and maser. Zhores Alferov contributed significantly to the creation of modern heterostructure physics and electronics. Oleg Losev made crucial contributions in the field of semiconductor junctions, and discovered light-emitting diodes. Vladimir Vernadsky is considered one of the founders of geochemistry, biogeochemistry, and radiogeology. Élie Metchnikoff is known for his groundbreaking research in immunology. Ivan Pavlov is known chiefly for his work in classical conditioning. Lev Landau made fundamental contributions to many areas of theoretical physics.

Nikolai Vavilov was best known for having identified the centers of origin of cultivated plants. Many famous Russian scientists and inventors were émigrés. Igor Sikorsky was an aviation pioneer. Vladimir Zworykin was the inventor of the iconoscope and kinescope television systems. Theodosius Dobzhansky was the central figure in the field of evolutionary biology for his work in shaping the modern synthesis. George Gamow was one of the foremost advocates of the Big Bang theory. Konstantin Tsiolkovsky is called the father of theoretical astronautics, whose works had inspired leading Soviet rocket engineers, such as Valentin Glushko, and many others.

In 1961, the first human trip into space was successfully made by Yuri Gagarin. In 1963, Valentina Tereshkova became the first and youngest woman in space, having flown a solo mission on Vostok 6. In 1965, Alexei Leonov became the first human to conduct a spacewalk, exiting the space capsule during Voskhod 2.

=== Painting ===
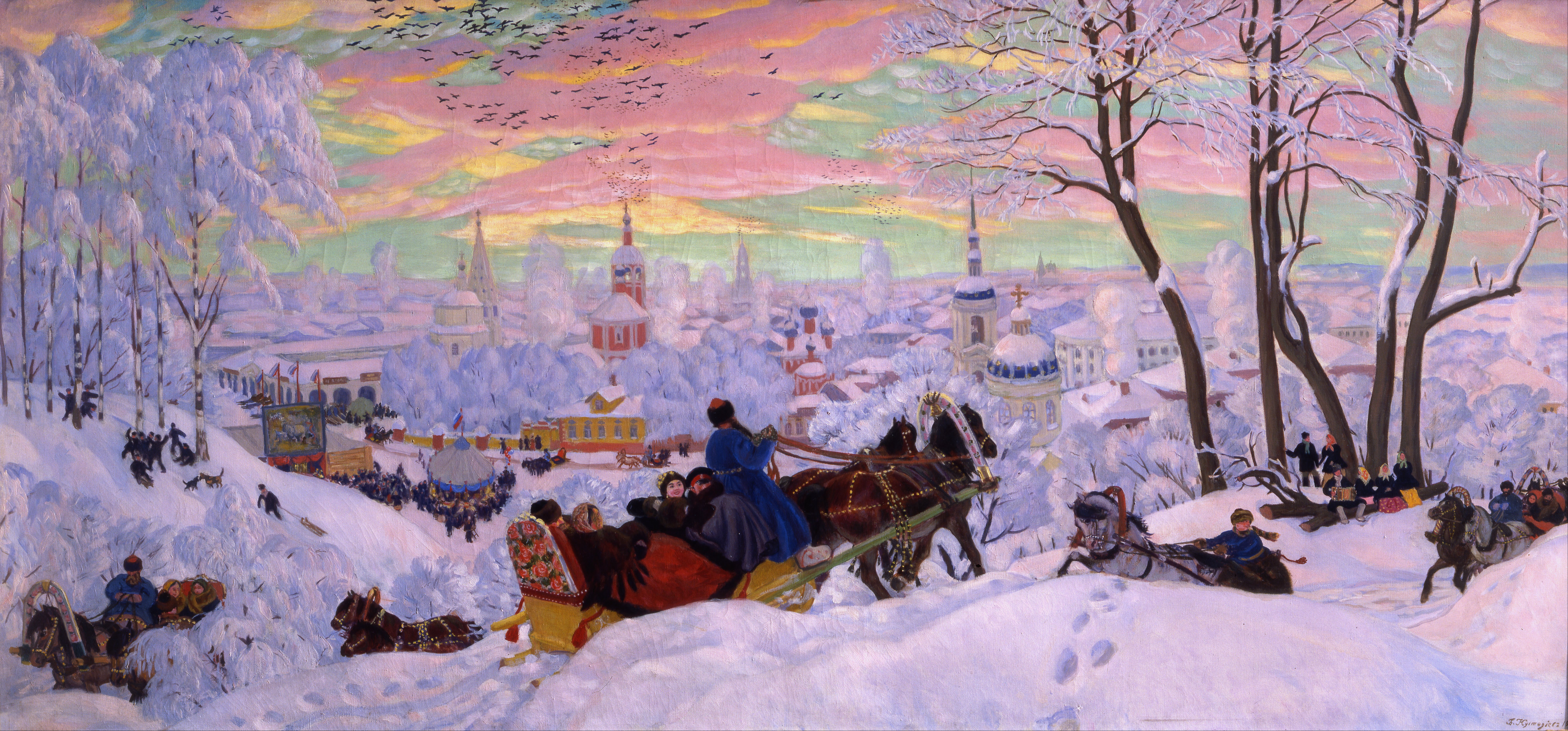
Russian artist Boris Kustodiev's Maslenitsa, 1916

Early Russian painting is represented in icons and vibrant frescos. In the early 15th century, the master icon painter Andrei Rublev created some of Russia's most treasured religious art. The Russian Academy of Arts, which was established in 1757, to train Russian artists, brought Western techniques of secular painting to Russia. In the 18th century, academicians Ivan Argunov, Dmitry Levitzky, Vladimir Borovikovsky became influential. The early 19th century saw many prominent paintings by Karl Briullov and Alexander Ivanov, both of whom were known for Romantic historical canvases. Ivan Aivazovsky, another Romantic painter, is considered one of the greatest masters of marine art.

In the 1860s, a group of critical realists (Peredvizhniki), led by Ivan Kramskoy, Ilya Repin and Vasiliy Perov broke with the academy, and portrayed the many-sided aspects of social life in paintings. The turn of the 20th century saw the rise of symbolism; represented by Mikhail Vrubel and Nicholas Roerich. The Russian avant-garde flourished from approximately 1890 to 1930; and globally influential artists from this era were El Lissitzky, Kazimir Malevich, Natalia Goncharova, Wassily Kandinsky, and Marc Chagall.

=== Music ===
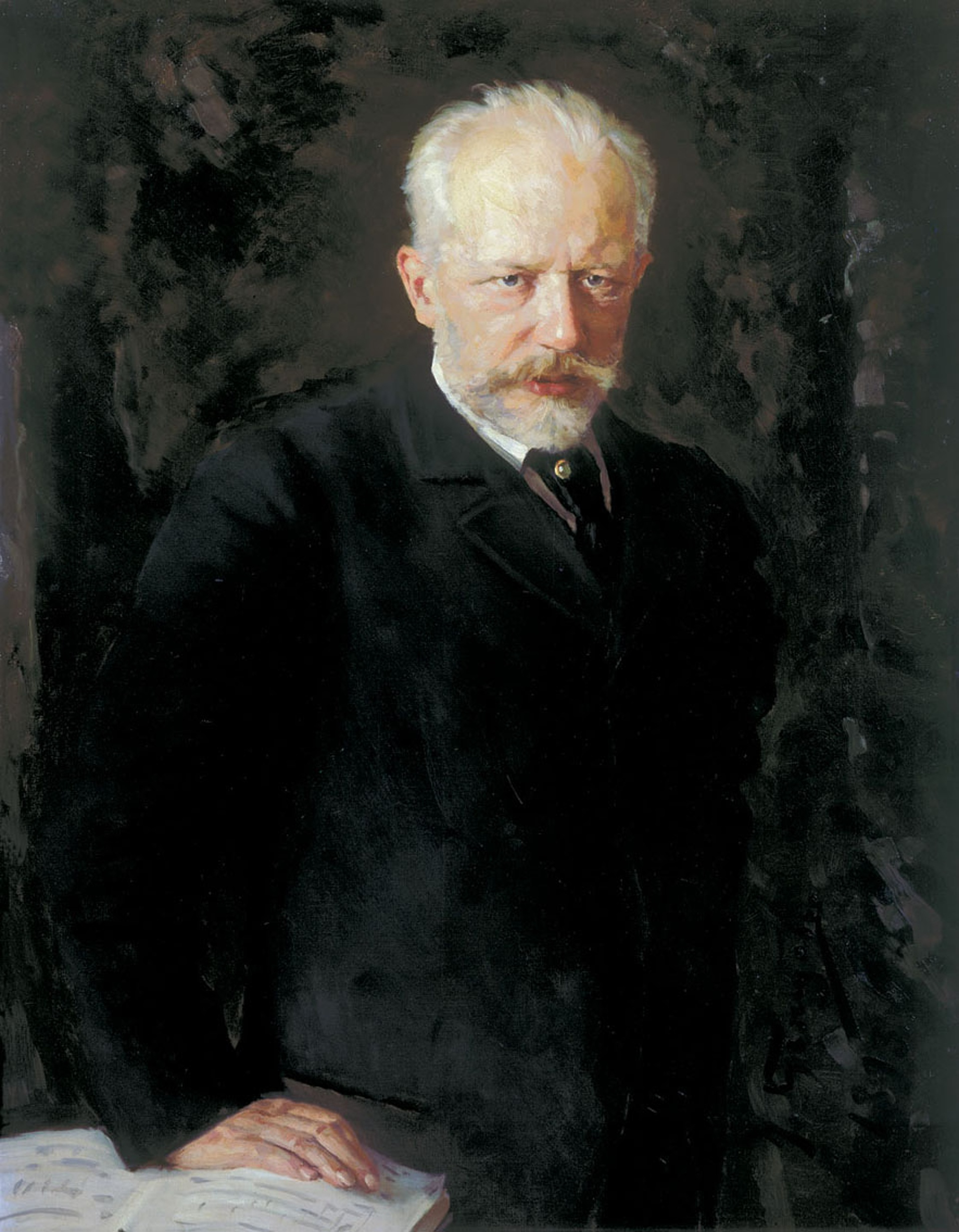
The classic ballet of Swan Lake was composed by Pyotr Ilyich Tchaikovsky (1840–1893)

Until the 18th century, music in Russia consisted mainly of church music and folk songs and dances. In the 19th century, it was defined by the tension between classical composer Mikhail Glinka along with other members of The Mighty Handful, and the Russian Musical Society led by composers Anton and Nikolay Rubinstein. The later tradition of Pyotr Ilyich Tchaikovsky, one of the greatest composers of the Romantic era, was continued into the 20th century by Sergei Rachmaninoff, one of the last great champions of the Romantic style of European classical music. World-renowned composers of the 20th century include Alexander Scriabin, Alexander Glazunov, Igor Stravinsky, Sergei Prokofiev, Dmitri Shostakovich, Georgy Sviridov and Alfred Schnittke.

Soviet and Russian conservatories have turned out generations of world-renowned soloists. Among the best known are violinists David Oistrakh and Gidon Kremer, cellist Mstislav Rostropovich, pianists Vladimir Horowitz, Sviatoslav Richter, and Emil Gilels, and vocalist Galina Vishnevskaya.

During the Soviet times, popular music also produced a number of renowned figures, such as the two balladeers—Vladimir Vysotsky and Bulat Okudzhava, and performers such as Alla Pugacheva. Jazz, even with sanctions from Soviet authorities, flourished and evolved into one of the country's most popular musical forms. The Ganelin Trio have been described by critics as the greatest ensemble of free-jazz in continental Europe. By the 1980s, rock music became popular across Russia, and produced bands such as Aria, Aquarium, DDT, and Kino. Pop music in Russia has continued to flourish since the 1960s, with globally famous acts such as t.A.T.u. In the recent times, Little Big, a rave band, has gained popularity in Russia and across Europe.

=== Cinema ===
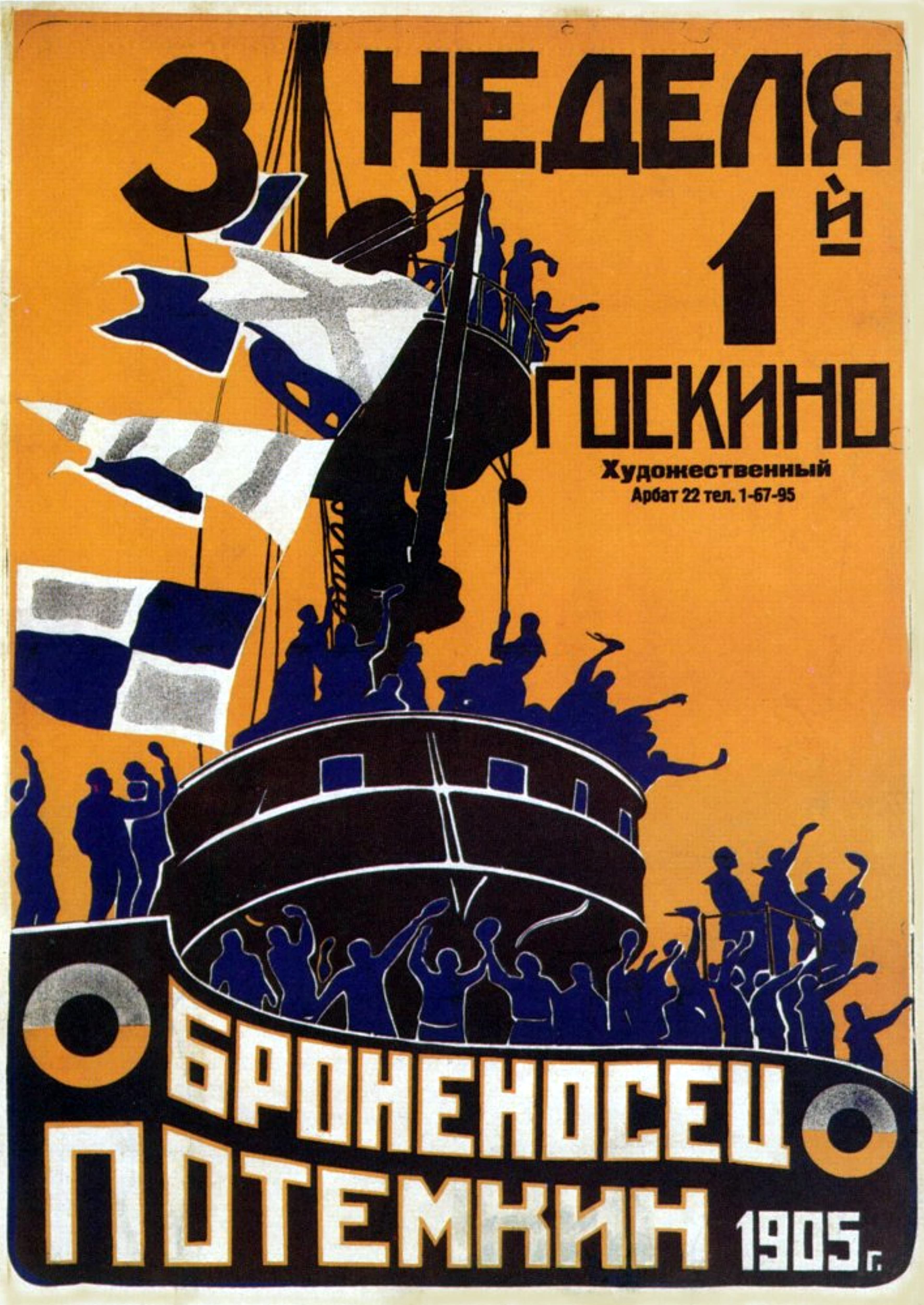
Poster of Battleship Potemkin (1925) by Sergei Eisenstein, which was named the greatest film of all time at the Brussels World's Fair in 1958.

Russian and later Soviet cinema was a hotbed of invention, resulting in world-renowned films such as The Battleship Potemkin. Soviet-era filmmakers, most notably Sergei Eisenstein and Andrei Tarkovsky, would go on to become among of the world's most innovative and influential directors. Eisenstein was a student of Lev Kuleshov, who developed the groundbreaking Soviet montage theory of film editing at the world's first film school, the All-Union Institute of Cinematography. Dziga Vertov's "Kino-Eye" theory had a huge impact on the development of documentary filmmaking and cinema realism. Many Soviet socialist realism films were artistically successful, including Chapaev, The Cranes Are Flying, and Ballad of a Soldier.

The 1960s and 1970s saw a greater variety of artistic styles in Soviet cinema. The comedies of Eldar Ryazanov and Leonid Gaidai of that time were immensely popular, with many of the catchphrases still in use today. In 1961–68 Sergey Bondarchuk directed an Oscar-winning film adaptation of Leo Tolstoy's epic War and Peace, which was the most expensive film made in the Soviet Union. In 1969, Vladimir Motyl's White Sun of the Desert was released, a very popular film in a genre of ostern; the film is traditionally watched by cosmonauts before any trip into space. In 2002, Russian Ark was the first feature film ever to be shot in a single take. Today, the Russian cinema industry continues to expand.

=== Architecture ===
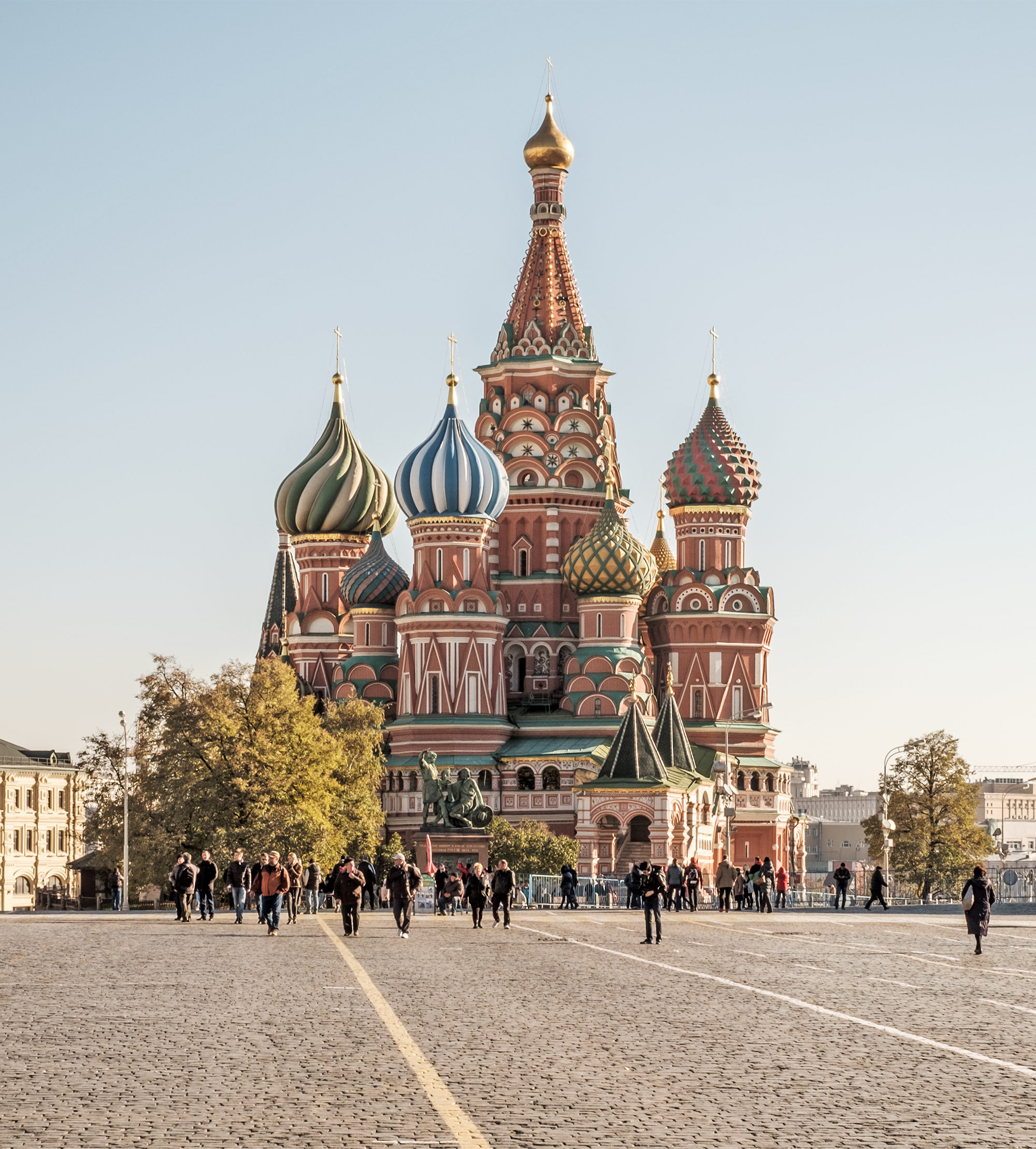
Saint Basil's Cathedral, built between 1555 and 1683 and combined earlier Russian church and the Tatar east styles, Moscow

The history of Russian architecture begins with early woodcraft buildings of ancient Slavs, and the architecture of Kievan Rus'. Following the Christianization of Kievan Rus', for several centuries it was influenced predominantly by the Byzantine Empire. Due to Mongol occupation cut ties with the Byzantine Empire Russian architecture inreached some original innovations, among them the church altar screen dividing iconostasis. Aristotle Fioravanti and other Italian architects brought Renaissance trends into Russia, especially in reconstruction of Kremlin. The 16th century saw the development of the unique tent-like churches; and the onion dome design, which is a distinctive feature of Russian architecture. In the 17th century, the "fiery style" of ornamentation flourished in Moscow and Yaroslavl, gradually paving the way for the Naryshkin baroque of the 1690s. After the reforms of Peter the Great, Russia's architecture became influenced by Western European styles. The 18th-century taste for Rococo architecture led to the splendid works of Bartolomeo Rastrelli and his followers. During the reign of Catherine the Great, Saint Petersburg was transformed into an outdoor museum of Neoclassical architecture. During Alexander I's rule, Empire style became the de facto architectural style, and Nicholas I opened the gate of Eclecticism to Russia. The second half of the 19th-century was dominated by the Neo-Byzantine and Russian Revival style. In early 20th-century, Russian neoclassical revival became a trend. Prevalent styles of the late 20th-century were the Art Nouveau, Constructivism, and Socialist Classicism.

=== Religion ===
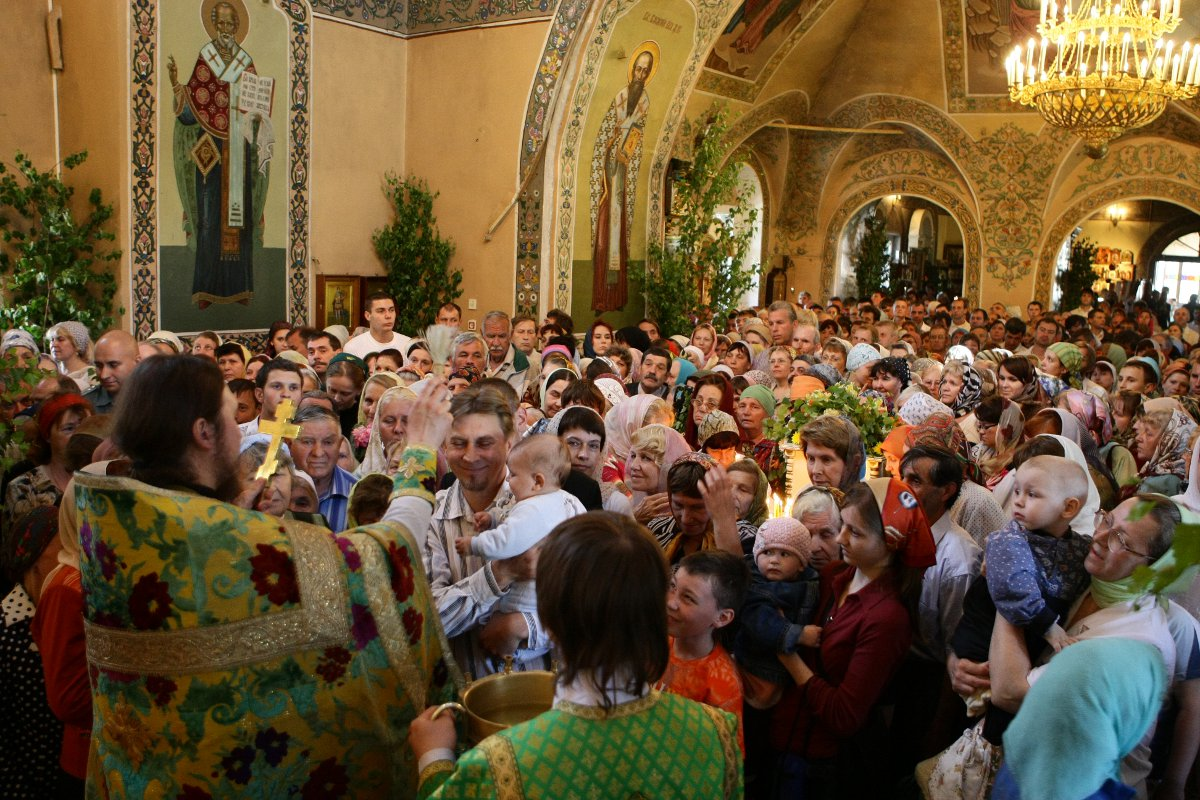
Trinity Sunday in Russia; the Russian Orthodox Church has experienced a great revival since the dissolution of the Soviet Union, a country that had a policy of state atheism.

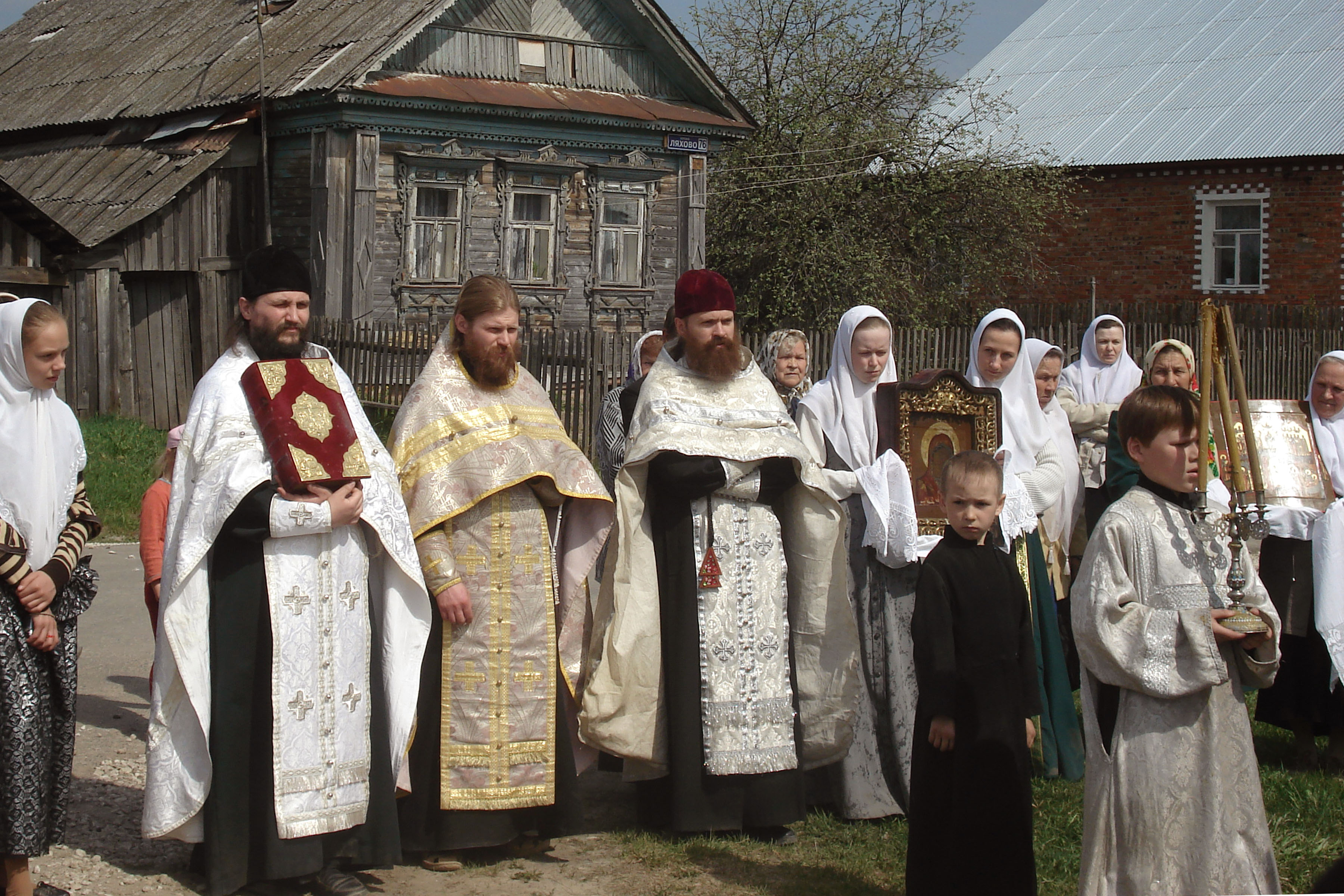
The communal Old Believers' service for the Bright Easter Week, Moscow Oblast.

Most religious Russians are Eastern Orthodox Christians. According to differing sociological surveys on religious adherence, between 41% to over 80% of the total population of Russia adhere to the Russian Orthodox Church.

Non-religious Russians may associate themselves with the Orthodox faith for cultural reasons. Some Russian people are Old Believers: a relatively small schismatic group of the Russian Orthodoxy that rejected the liturgical reforms introduced in the 17th century. Other schisms from Orthodoxy include Spiritual Christianity, namely Doukhobors which in the 18th century rejected secular government, the Russian Orthodox priests, icons, all church ritual, the Bible as the supreme source of divine revelation and the divinity of Jesus, and later emigrated into Canada. Another Spiritual Christian movement were Molokans which formed in the 19th century and rejected Czar's divine right to rule, icons, the Trinity as outlined by the Nicene Creed, Orthodox fasts, military service, and practices including water baptism.

Other world religions have negligible representation among ethnic Russians. The largest of these groups are Islam with over 100,000 followers from national minorities, and Baptists with over 85,000 Russian adherents. Others are mostly Pentecostals, Evangelicals, Seventh-day Adventists, Lutherans, The Salvation Army, and Jehovah's Witnesses.

Since the fall of the Soviet Union various new religious movements have sprung up and gathered a following among ethnic Russians. The most prominent of these are Rodnovery, the revival of the Slavic native religion also common to other Slavic nations.

=== Sports ===
Football is the most popular sport in Russia. The Soviet Union national football team became the first European champions by winning Euro 1960, and reached the finals of Euro 1988. In 1956 and 1988, the Soviet Union won gold at the Olympic football tournament. Russian clubs CSKA Moscow and Zenit Saint Petersburg won the UEFA Cup in 2005 and 2008. The Russian national football team reached the semi-finals of Euro 2008. Russia was the host nation for the 2017 FIFA Confederations Cup, and the 2018 FIFA World Cup.

Ice hockey is very popular in Russia. The Soviet Union men's national ice hockey team dominated the sport internationally throughout its existence, and the modern-day Russia men's national ice hockey team is among the most successful teams in the sport. Bandy is Russia's national sport, and it has historically been the highest-achieving country in the sport. The Russian national basketball team won the EuroBasket 2007, and the Russian basketball club PBC CSKA Moscow is among the most successful European basketball teams. The annual Formula One Russian Grand Prix was held at the Sochi Autodrom in the Sochi Olympic Park.

Russia is the leading nation in rhythmic gymnastics; and Russian synchronized swimming is considered to be the world's best. Figure skating is another popular sport in Russia, especially pair skating and ice dancing. Russia has produced a number of famous tennis players, such as Maria Sharapova and Daniil Medvedev. Chess is also a widely popular pastime in the nation, with many of the world's top chess players being Russian for decades. The 1980 Summer Olympic Games were held in Moscow, and the 2014 Winter Olympics and the 2014 Winter Paralympics were hosted in Sochi.

== See also ==
- All-Russian nation
- European ethnic groups
- List of Russian artists
- List of Slavic studies journals
- Russian diaspora
