= Romny =

City in Sumy Oblast, Ukraine

Romny Ромни
- City
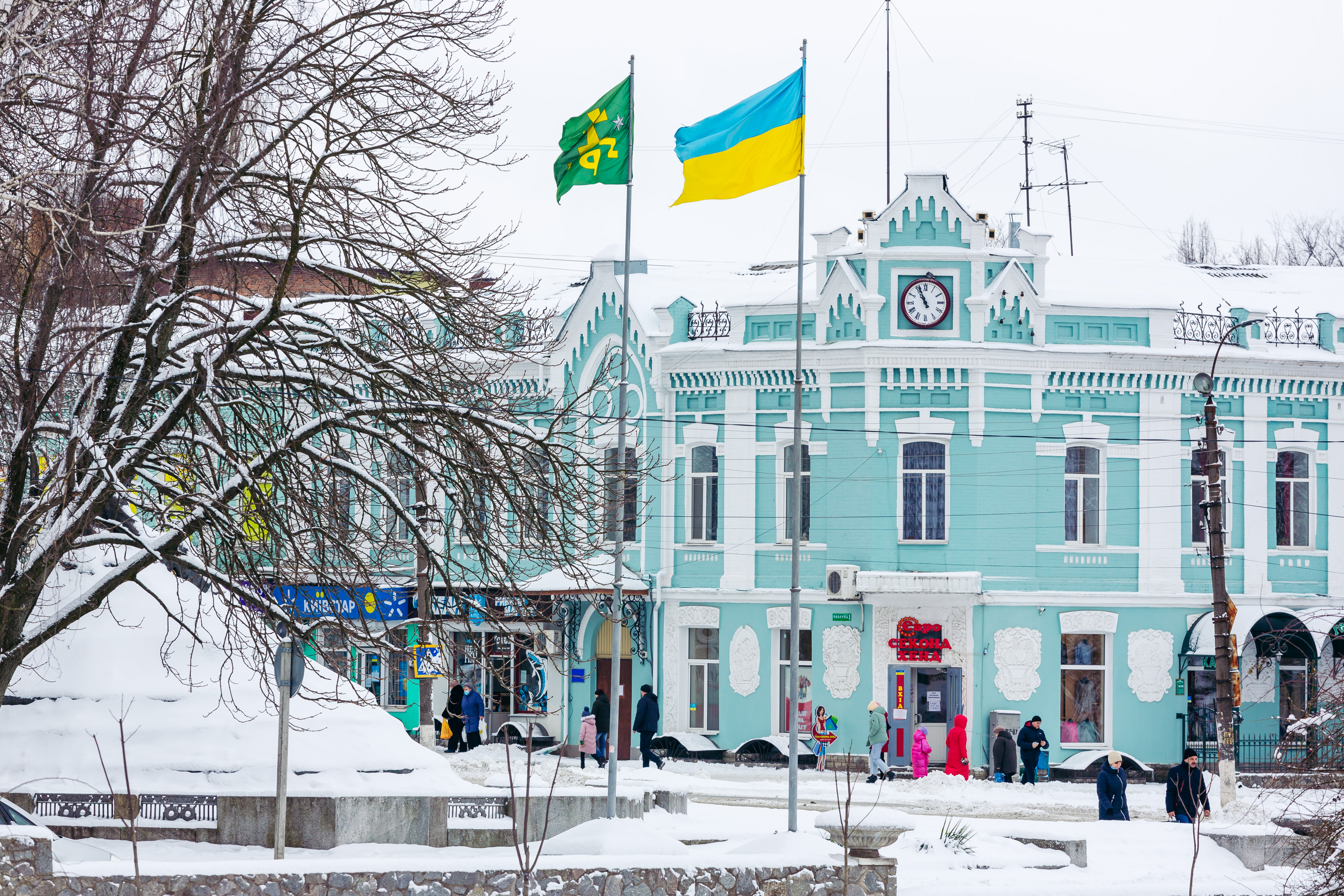
- Former bank building

- Flag Seal

- Location within Ukraine Location within Sumy Oblast
- Coordinates: 50°45′N 33°28′E
- Country: Ukraine
- Oblast: Sumy Oblast
- Raion: Romny Raion
- Hromada: Romny urban hromada
- First mentioned: 1096
- City rights: 1781

Area
  - Total: 65 km^{2} (25 sq mi)
- Elevation: 171 m (561 ft)

Population (2022)
  - Total: 37,765
- Website: forum.romny.info

Romny (Ukrainian: Ромни, IPA: [romˈnɪ]) is a city in Sumy Oblast, northern Ukraine. It is located on the Romen River. Romny serves as the administrative centre of Romny Raion and hosts the administration of Romny urban hromada, one of the hromadas of Ukraine. Population: 37,765 (2022 estimate).

== History ==
The city was founded in AD 902. On September 16, 2002, the city celebrated its 1,100th anniversary. Romny was first mentioned in documents in 1096 (as Romen, Cyrillic: Ромен; the name, originally that of the river, is of Baltic origin, cf. Lithuanian romus 'quiet'). At various times, it passed under Mongol, Lithuanian, Polish and Russian rule. By 1638, the city had a population of 6,000 inhabitants, which made it by far the largest settlement in the area. In 1781, the city was granted a charter by the Tsarina Catherine II.

Romny was the terminus of the Libau-Romny railway which was built to deliver Ukrainian goods, mostly grains, for export. It also served as main route for emigration to the Americas through the Libau post where passenger ships were accessed.

In Romny the first statue of Taras Shevchenko was erected on 27 October 1918 when the city was located in the newly established Ukrainian State. It was preserved as part of the Soviet Union Ukrainization policies. The concrete statue in Romny began to decay in the 1950s, but was remade in bronze and re-unveiled in 1982. The original version of the monument is located on Kyiv's Andriyivskyy Descent.

Unimaginable suffering was inflicted on the people of Romny during the years of Bolshevik rule, two world wars, famines, and repressions. During the Holodomor of 1932–1933, organized by the Soviet authorities, at least 2274 residents of the city died.

During World War II, Romny was occupied by the German Army from September 10, 1941, to September 16, 1943. The Germans operated a Nazi prison, the Dulag 112 transit prisoner-of-war camp and a subcamp of the Dulag 124 transit POW camp in the city.

In the period between 1979 and 1989, Romny's population rose from 53,016 to 57,502 inhabitants.

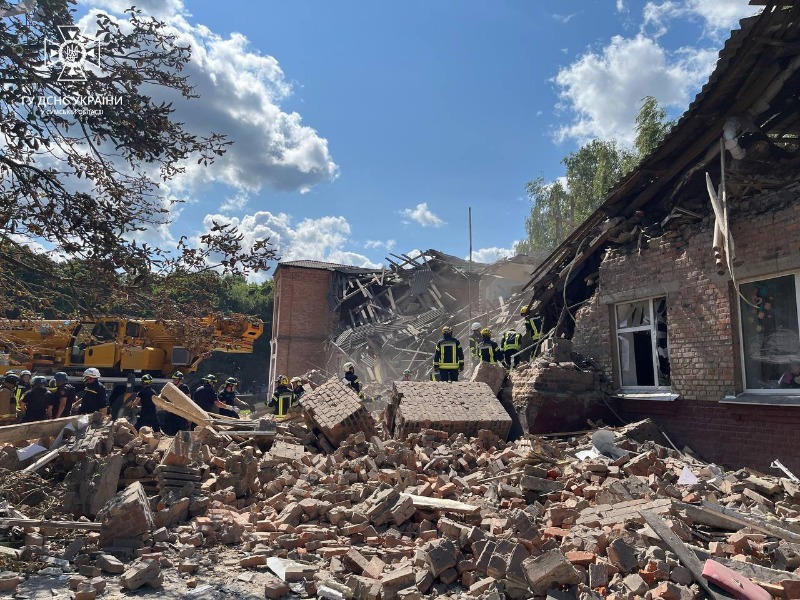
School in Romny after a Russian drone attack, 2023

In 2022, a series of military engagements occurred near Romny during the 2022 Russian invasion of Ukraine.

== Population ==
=== Ethnicity ===
According to the 2001 Ukrainian census, the city had a population of 49,935 inhabitants. The ethnic composition was as follows:

Ethnic groups in Romny
	percent
Ukrainians	93.68%
Russians	5.42%
Belarusians	0.70%
others	0.16%

=== Language ===
Distribution of the population by native language according to the 2001 census:

Language	Percentage
Ukrainian	93.95%
Russian	5.70%
other/undecided	0.35%

== Geography ==
=== Climate ===
Climate data for Romny (1991–2020)
Month	Jan	Feb	Mar	Apr	May	Jun	Jul	Aug	Sep	Oct	Nov	Dec	Year
Mean daily maximum °C (°F)	−2.1 (28.2)	−0.7 (30.7)	5.2 (41.4)	14.6 (58.3)	21.1 (70.0)	24.4 (75.9)	26.3 (79.3)	25.8 (78.4)	19.6 (67.3)	12.2 (54.0)	4.2 (39.6)	−0.8 (30.6)	12.5 (54.5)
Daily mean °C (°F)	−4.6 (23.7)	−3.9 (25.0)	1.1 (34.0)	9.2 (48.6)	15.2 (59.4)	18.8 (65.8)	20.6 (69.1)	19.6 (67.3)	14.0 (57.2)	7.6 (45.7)	1.4 (34.5)	−3.0 (26.6)	8.0 (46.4)
Mean daily minimum °C (°F)	−7.2 (19.0)	−6.8 (19.8)	−2.4 (27.7)	4.3 (39.7)	9.6 (49.3)	13.5 (56.3)	15.3 (59.5)	14.0 (57.2)	9.1 (48.4)	3.9 (39.0)	−0.9 (30.4)	−5.3 (22.5)	3.9 (39.0)
Average precipitation mm (inches)	49 (1.9)	40 (1.6)	45 (1.8)	37 (1.5)	57 (2.2)	70 (2.8)	76 (3.0)	42 (1.7)	54 (2.1)	45 (1.8)	41 (1.6)	49 (1.9)	605 (23.8)
Average precipitation days (≥ 1.0 mm)	9.9	8.4	8.9	7.0	8.5	8.5	8.7	5.6	7.3	7.5	7.4	8.9	96.6
Average relative humidity (%)	85.1	82.1	76.3	65.8	65.9	69.2	71.6	68.4	74.3	80.2	86.9	87.6	76.1
Source: NOAA

== Sights ==
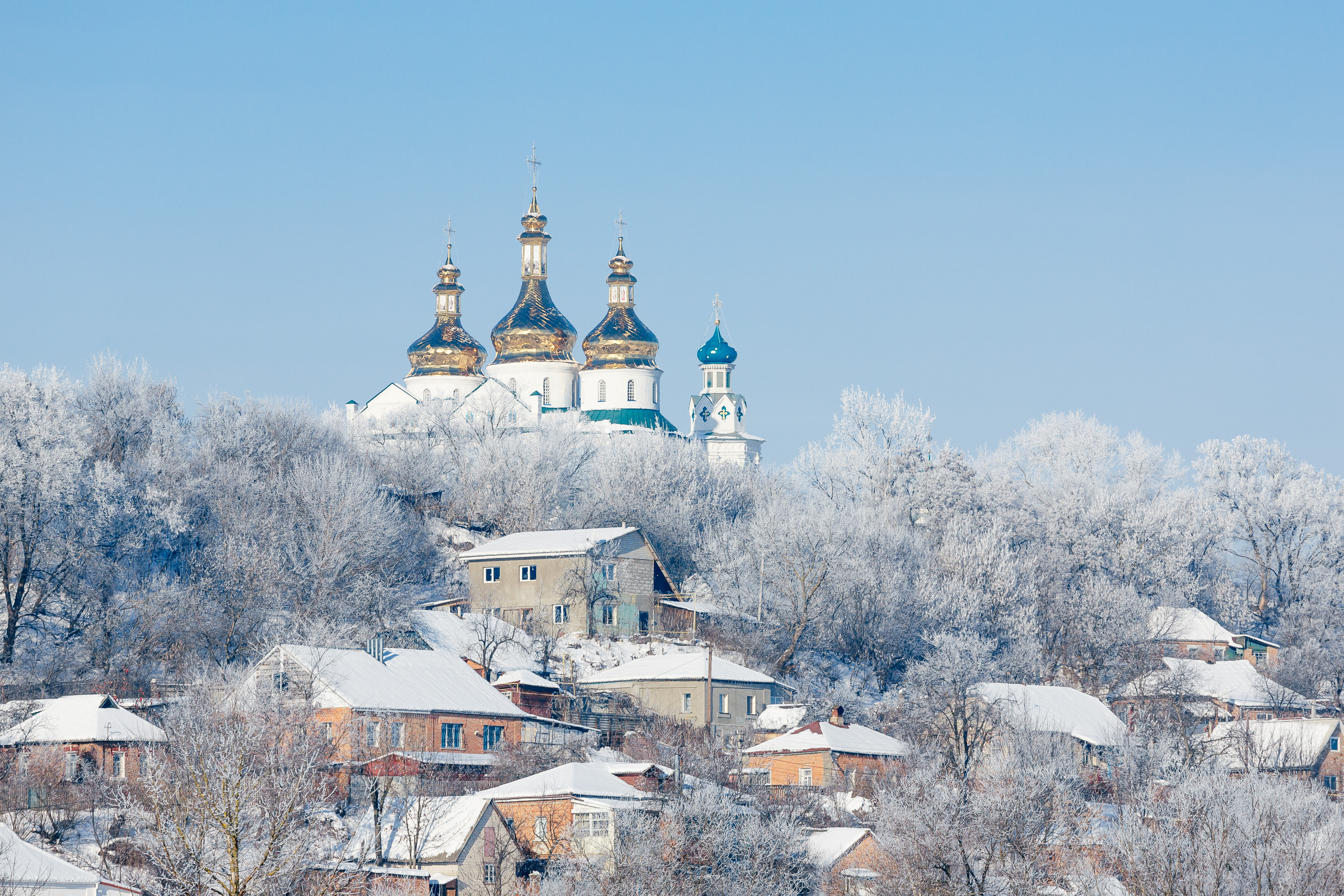
Holy Spirit Cathedral

The cathedral of the Holy Spirit, founded in 1735 in place of a wooden church, is a four-pillared cathedral designed in the Ukrainian Baroque style and is surmounted by three pear-shaped domes, each placed on a tall cylinder. Although the cathedral dates back to the 1740s, the building of the nearby belfry and winter church was not undertaken until 1780.

Another noteworthy building is the church of the Ascension, which also has three domes, but was constructed later, in 1795–1801, and adjoins a Baroque belfry built in 1753–63.

== Local government ==
Posullya
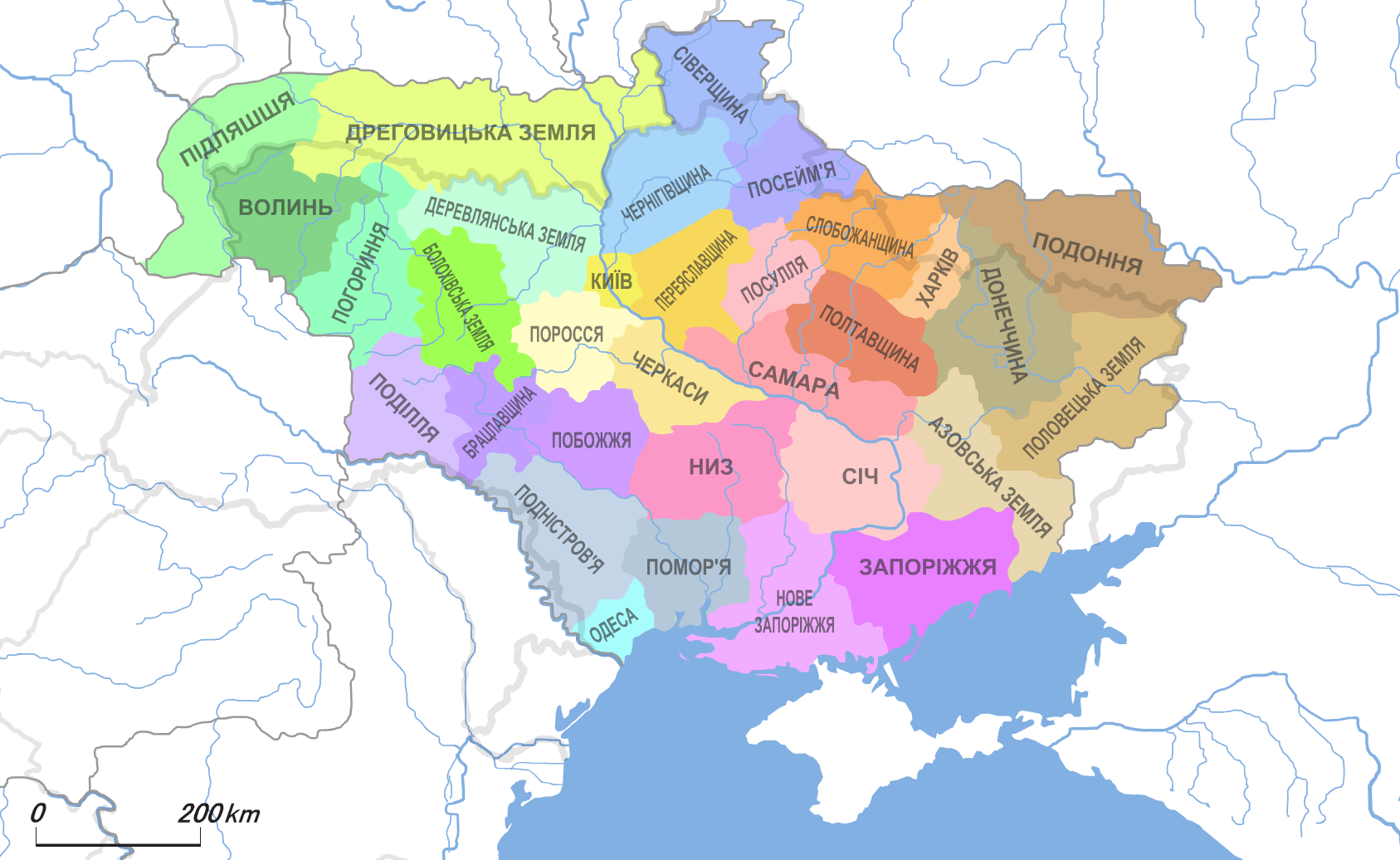
- Posullya on the map
- Capital: Romny
- Founded: 6 March 1918
- Abolished: 29 April 1918

Posullya was a zemlia of the Ukrainian People's Republic with the administrative center in Romny. Founded on 6 March 1918 according to the Law "On the administrative-territorial division of Ukraine" approved by the Central Council of Ukraine, it was disbanded on 29 April 1918 by Hetman of Ukraine Pavlo Skoropadsky, who restored the old governorate division of the Russian Empire. The administrative unit included Romny, Lokhvytsia, Hadiach, parts Lubny and Myrhorod povits of the Poltava Governorate.

Beside the city itself, the city municipality also serves as government for a village Kolisnykove and a settlement Luchky. The city also has administration of the surrounding Romny Raion.

== Notable people ==
- Yevhen Adamtsevych (1904–1972), prominent blind Ukrainian bandurist
- Haim Arlosoroff (1899–1933), notable Socialist Zionist leader
- Maksym Biletskyi (born 1980), Ukrainian footballer
- Larisa Netšeporuk (born 1970), heptathlete who represented Ukraine and Estonia
- Andriy Potebnia (1838-1863), Ukrainian officer of the Russian Imperial Army, participant of the January Uprising
- Pinhas Rutenberg (1879–1942), Russian socialist revolutionary and Zionist leader in Palestine, prominent engineer and businessman
- Isaac Schwartz (1923–2009), Soviet composer
- Grigory Sokolnikov (born Hirsch Brilliant; 1888–1939), Bolshevik revolutionary and Soviet politician
- Joachim Stutschewsky (1891–1982), Austrian and Israeli cellist, composer, and musicologist
- Abram Ioffe (1880–1960), prominent Russian/Soviet physicist
- Several of the founding members (1909–10) of Degania, the first kibbutz settlement in Palestine

== Gallery ==
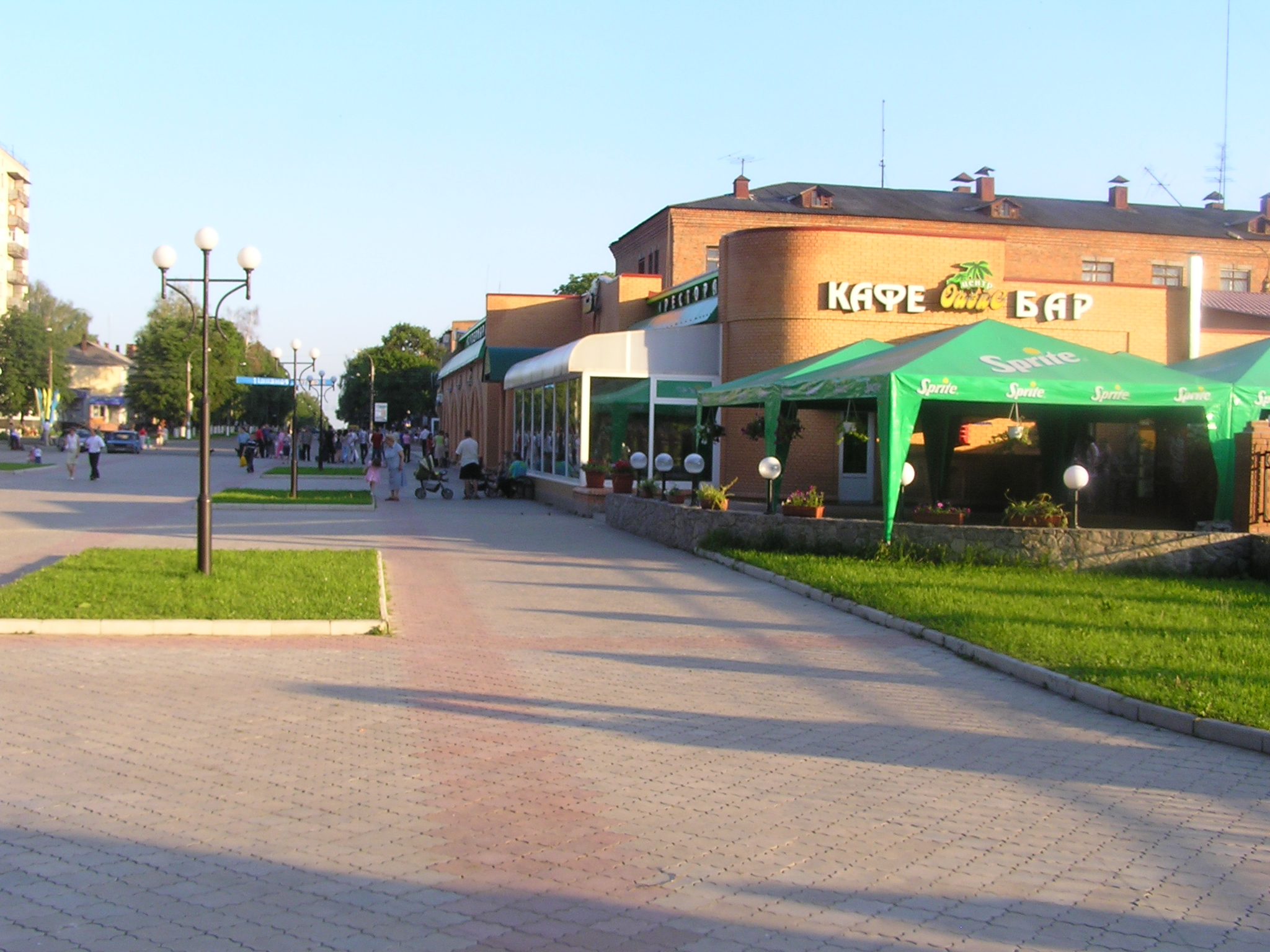
Downtown Romny

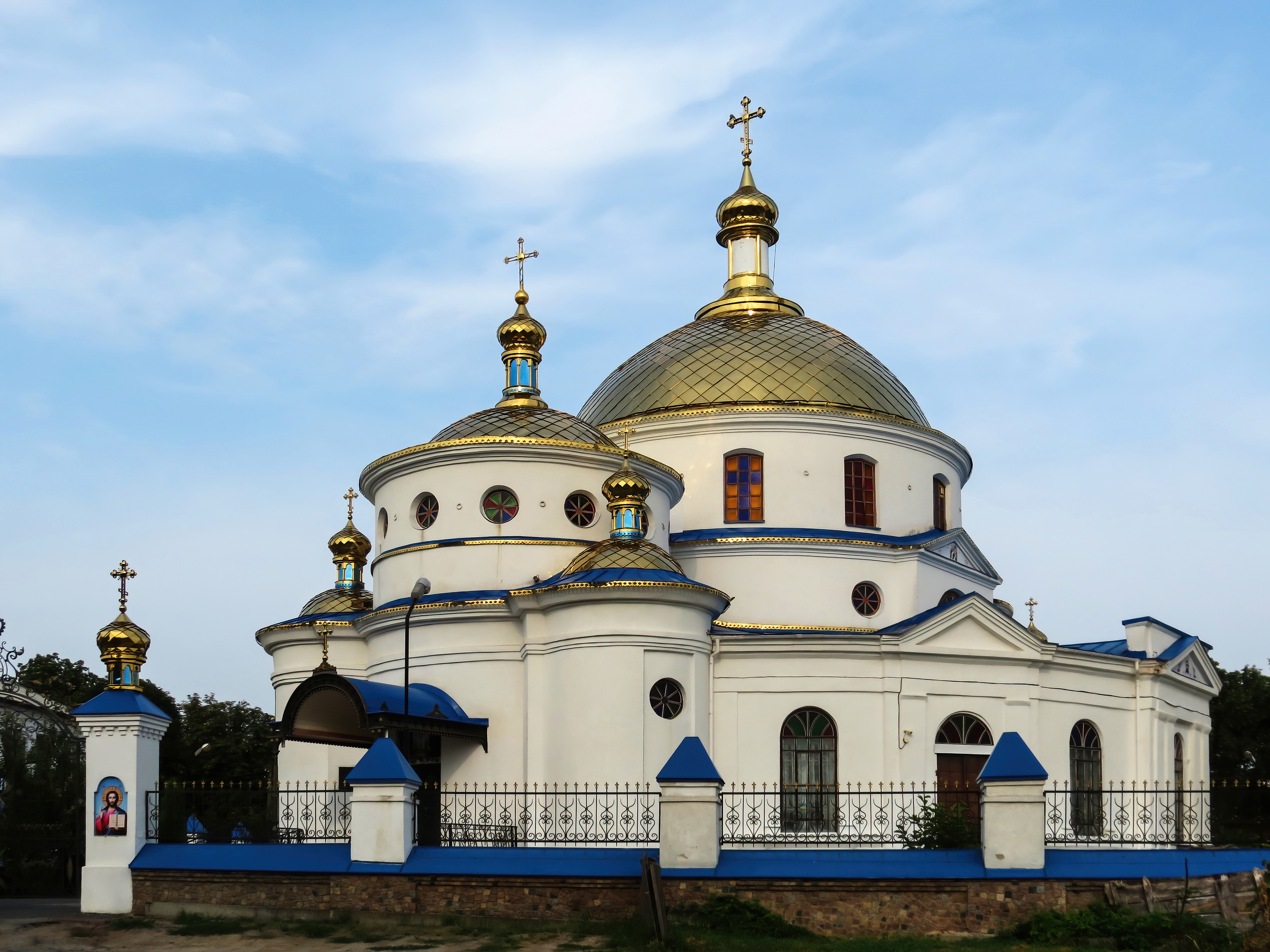
Ascension Church

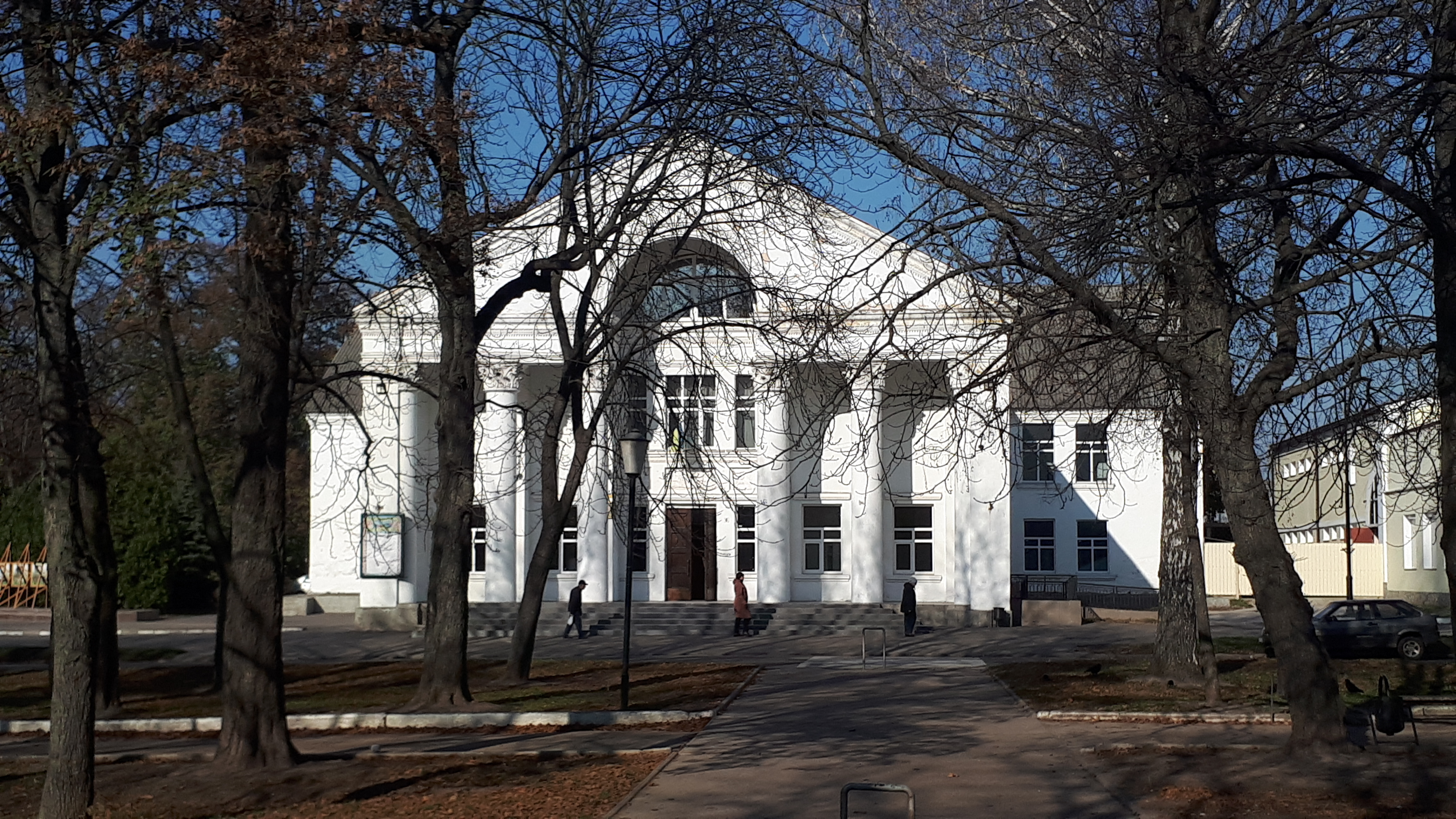
Palace of Culture

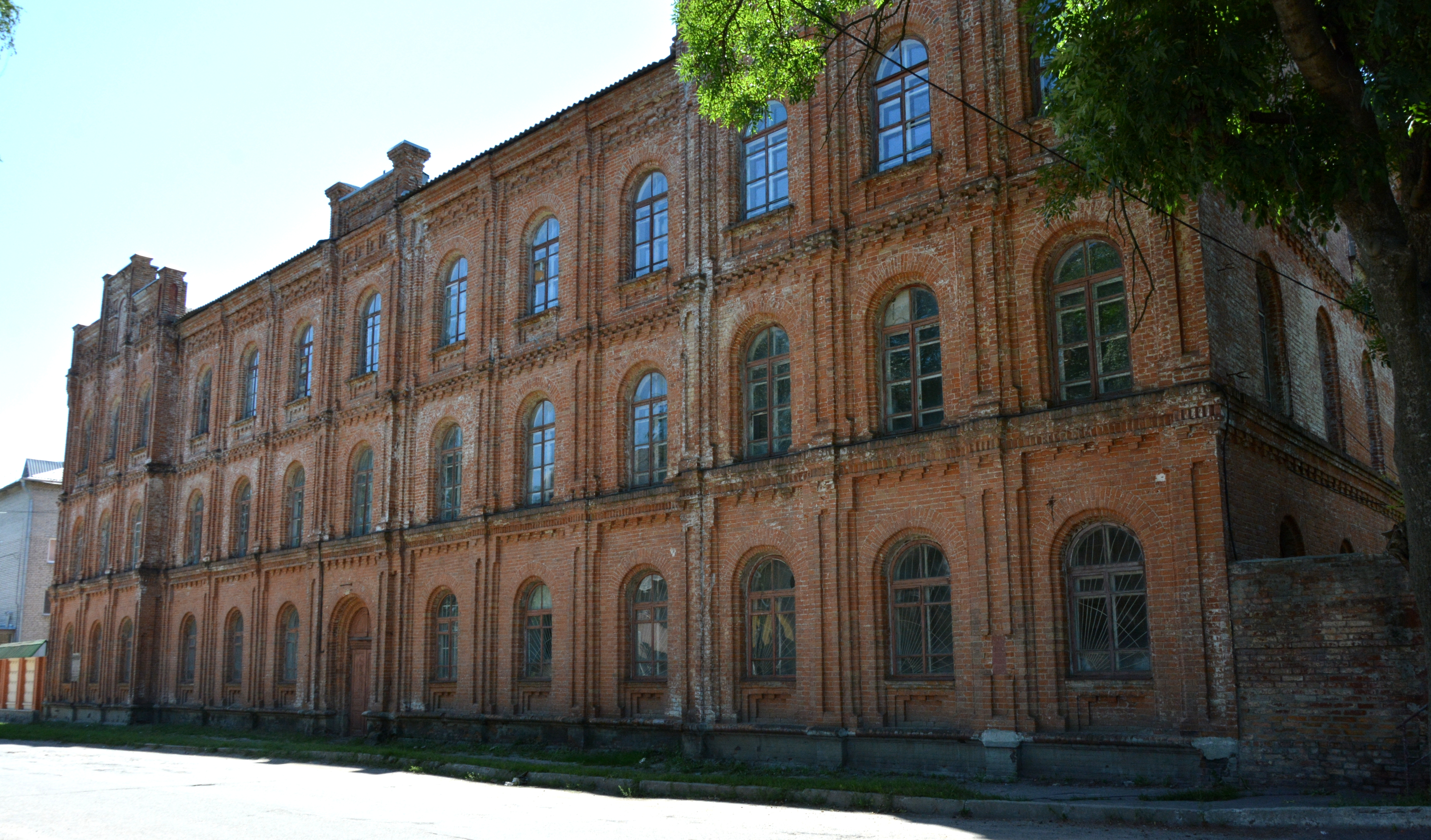
Former seminary

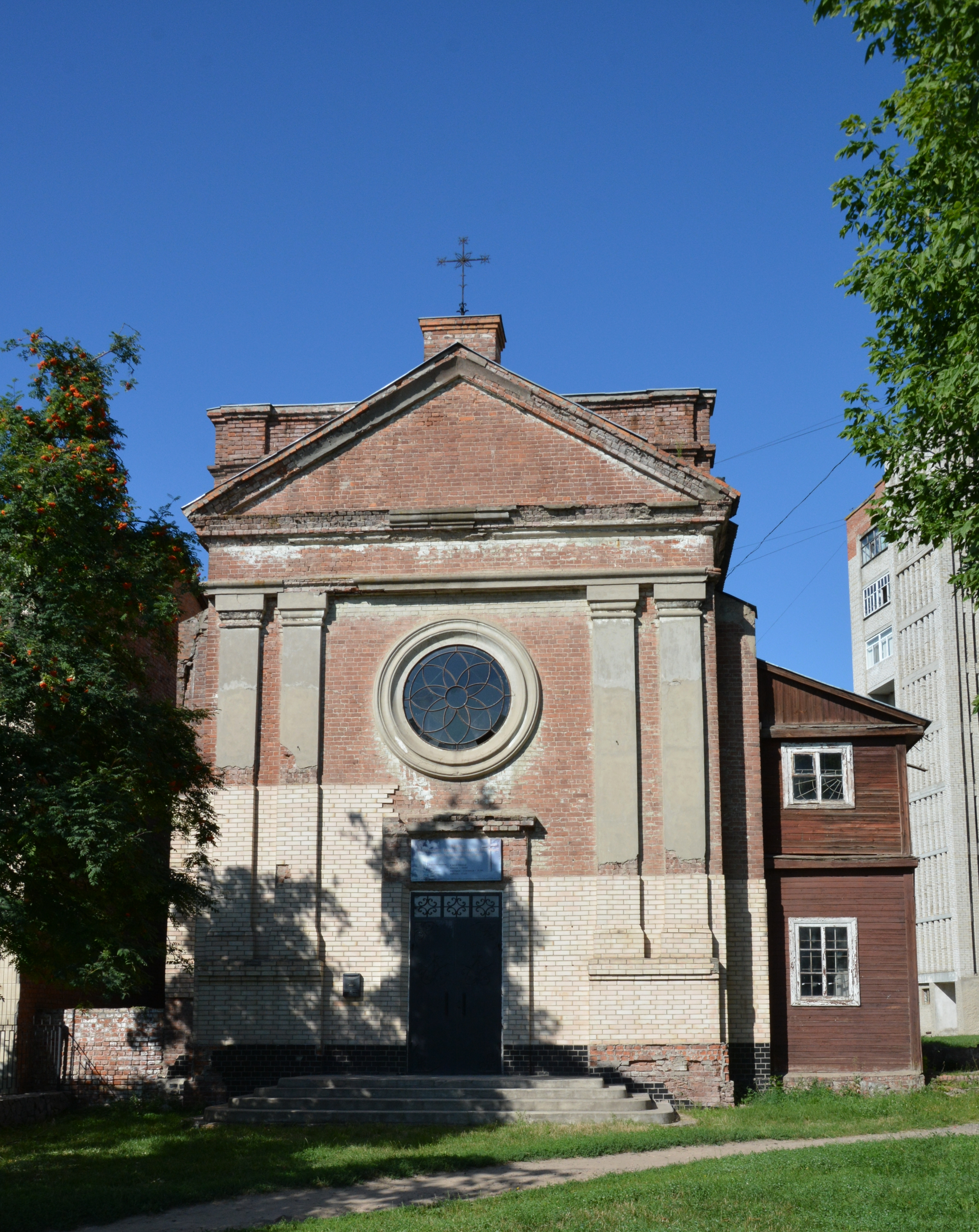
Roman Catholic church of the Immaculate Conception

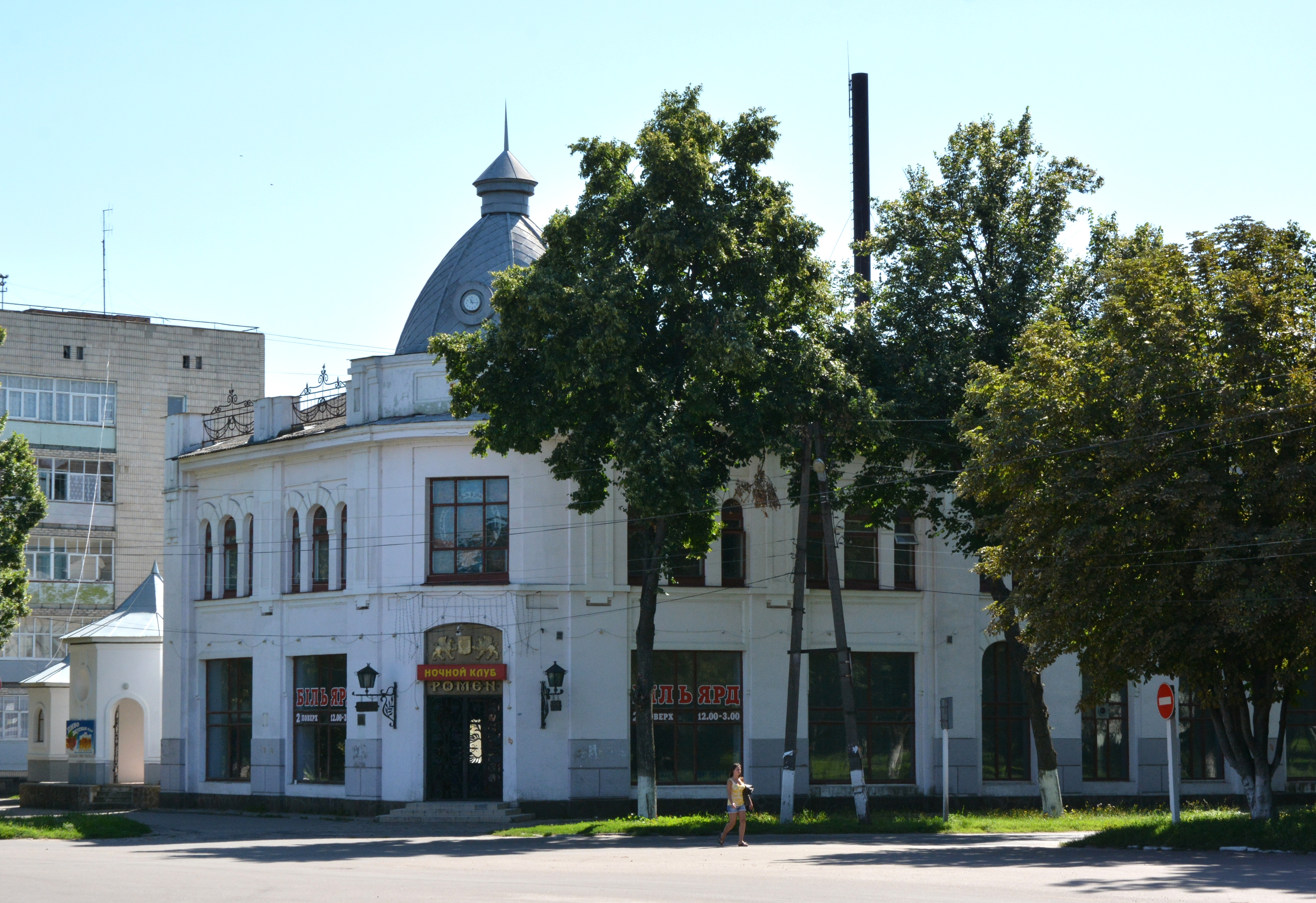
Former trading house

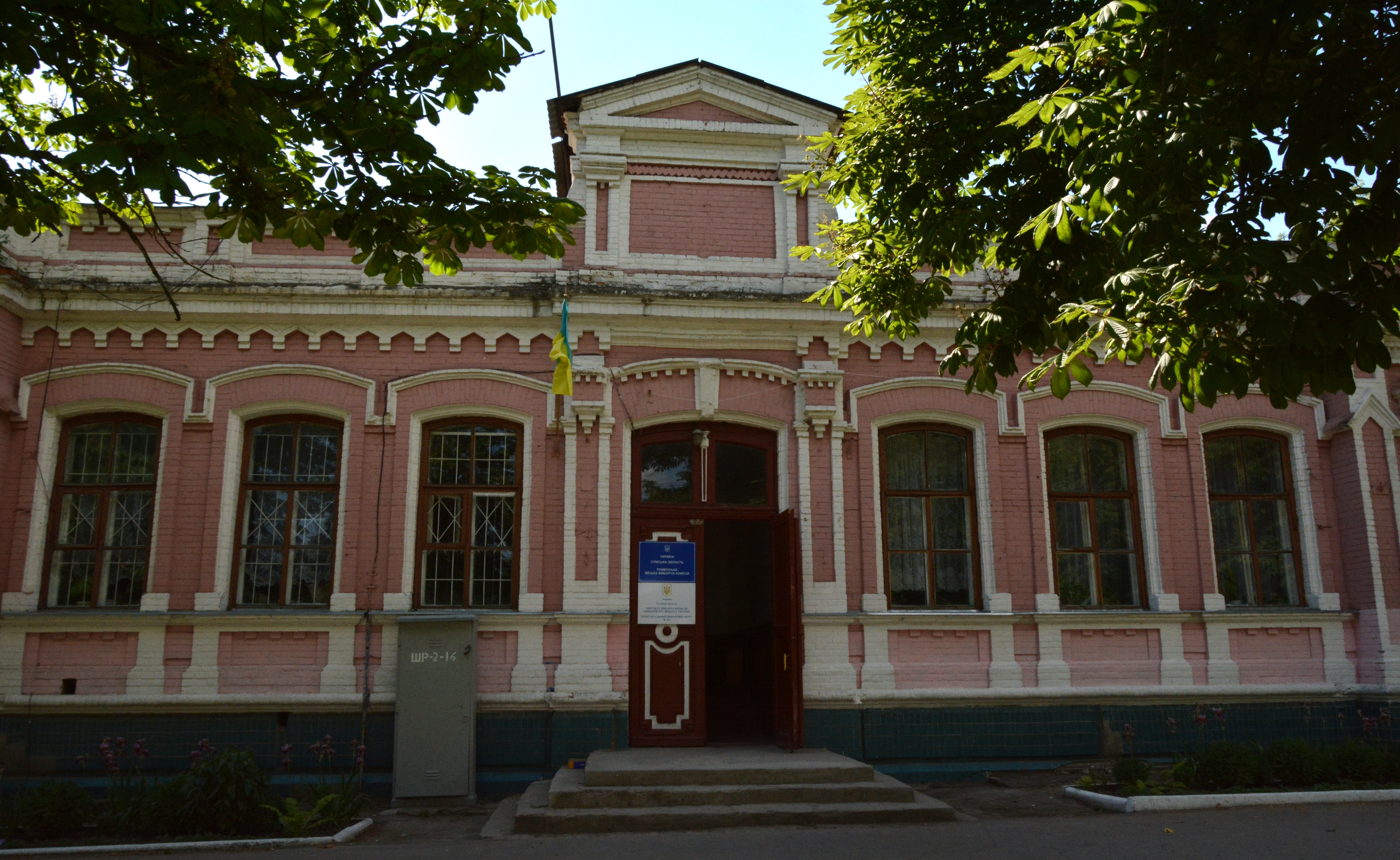
Historical school building

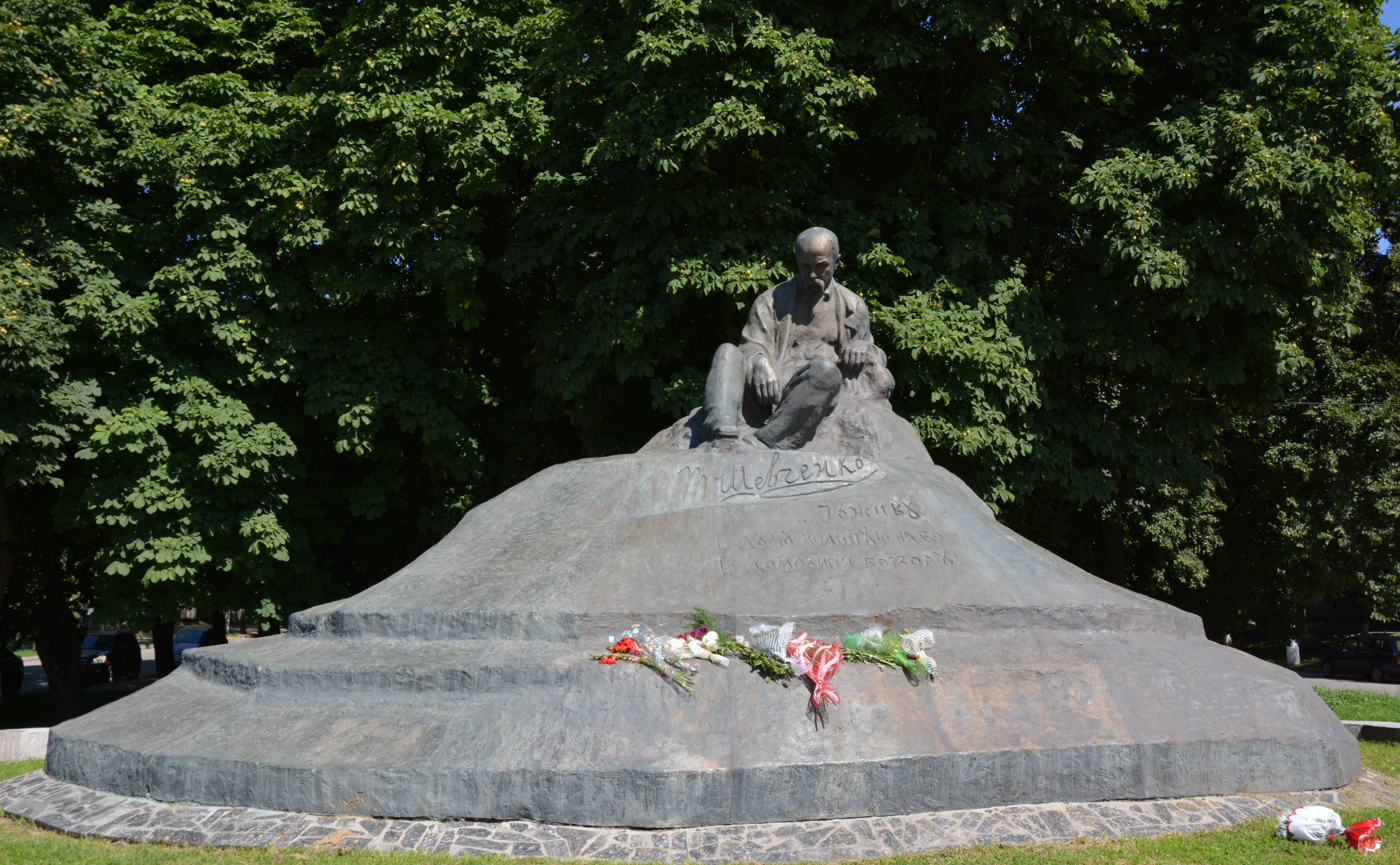
Taras Shevchenko monument

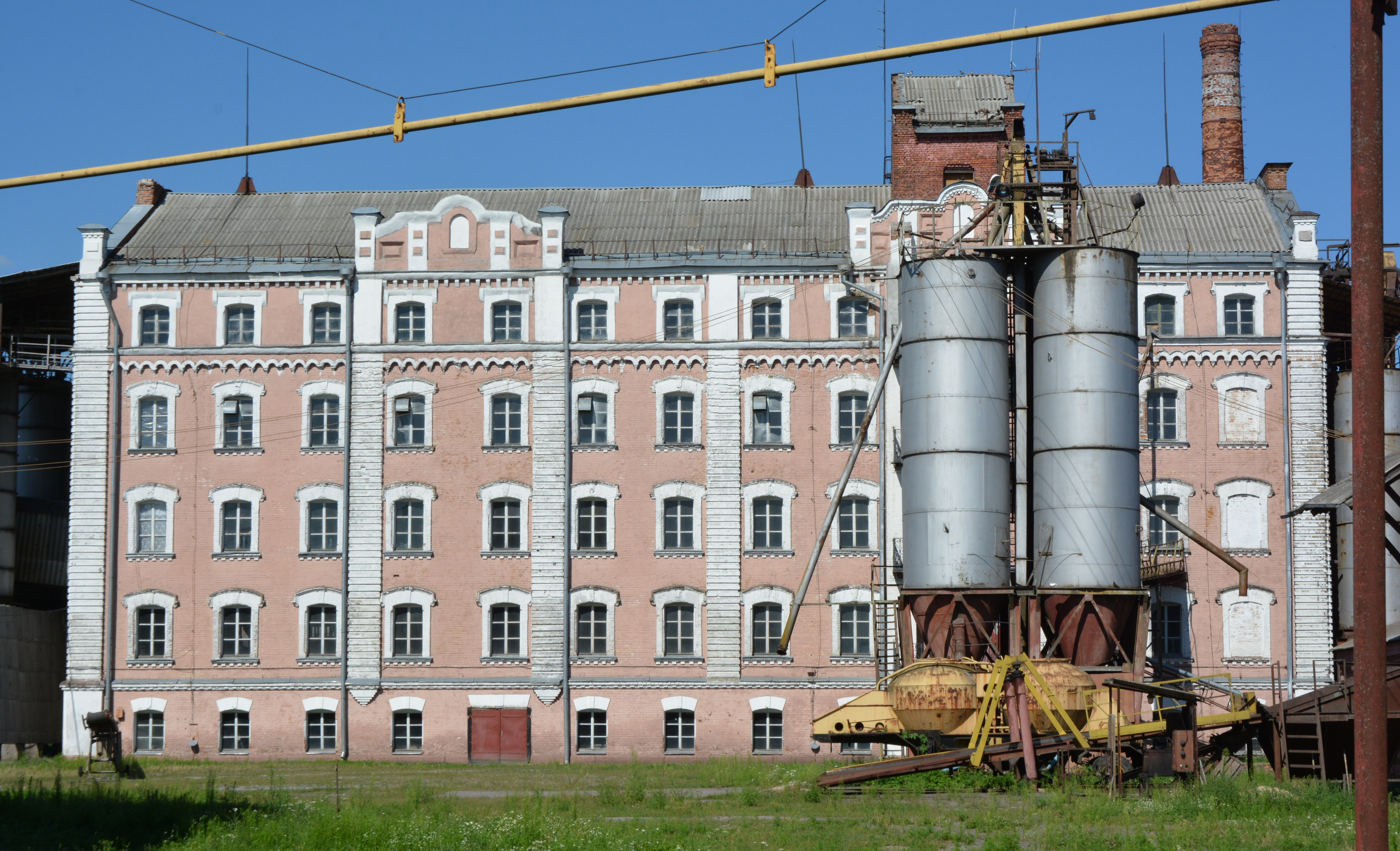
Steam mill in Romny

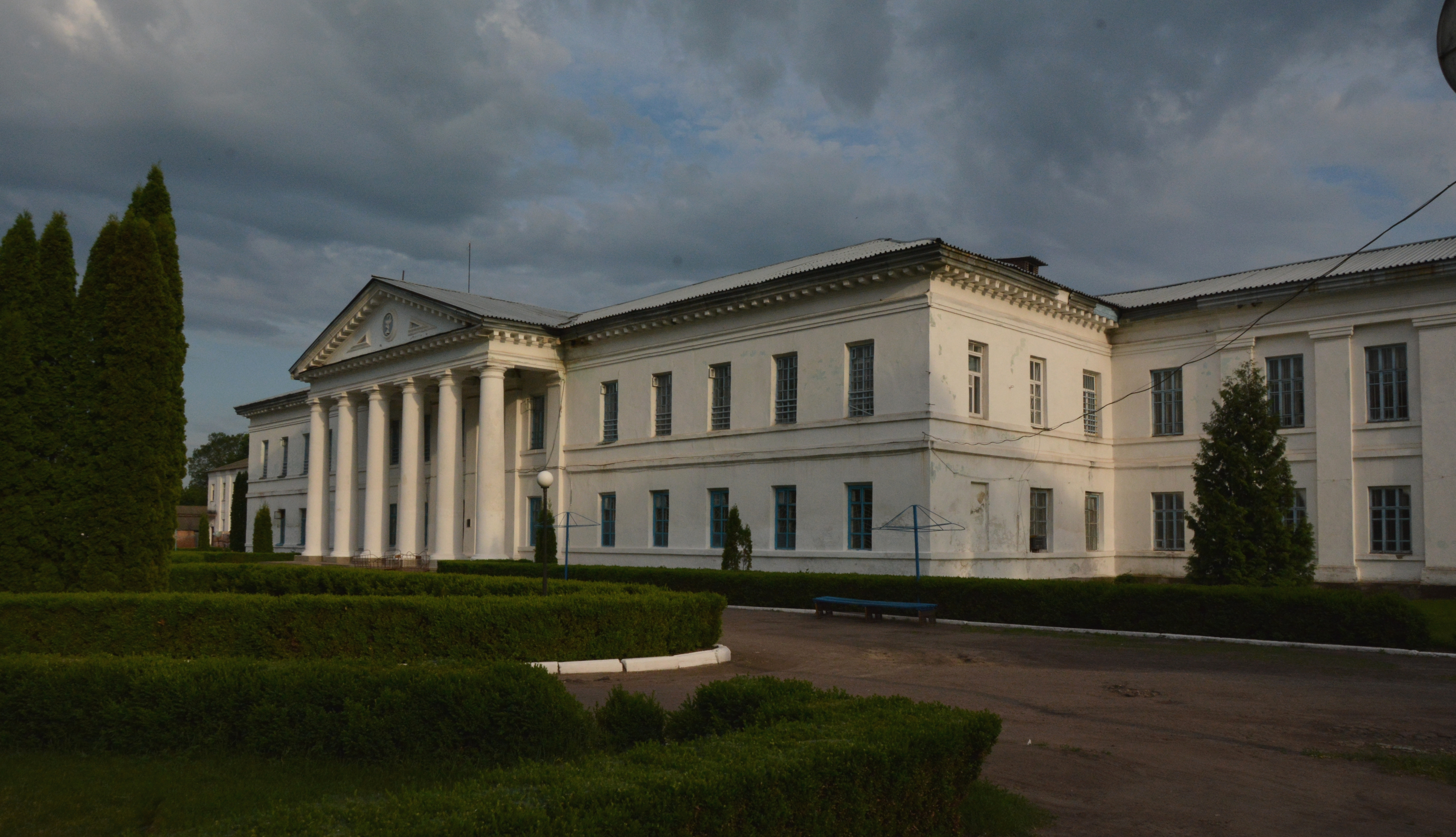
District hospital building

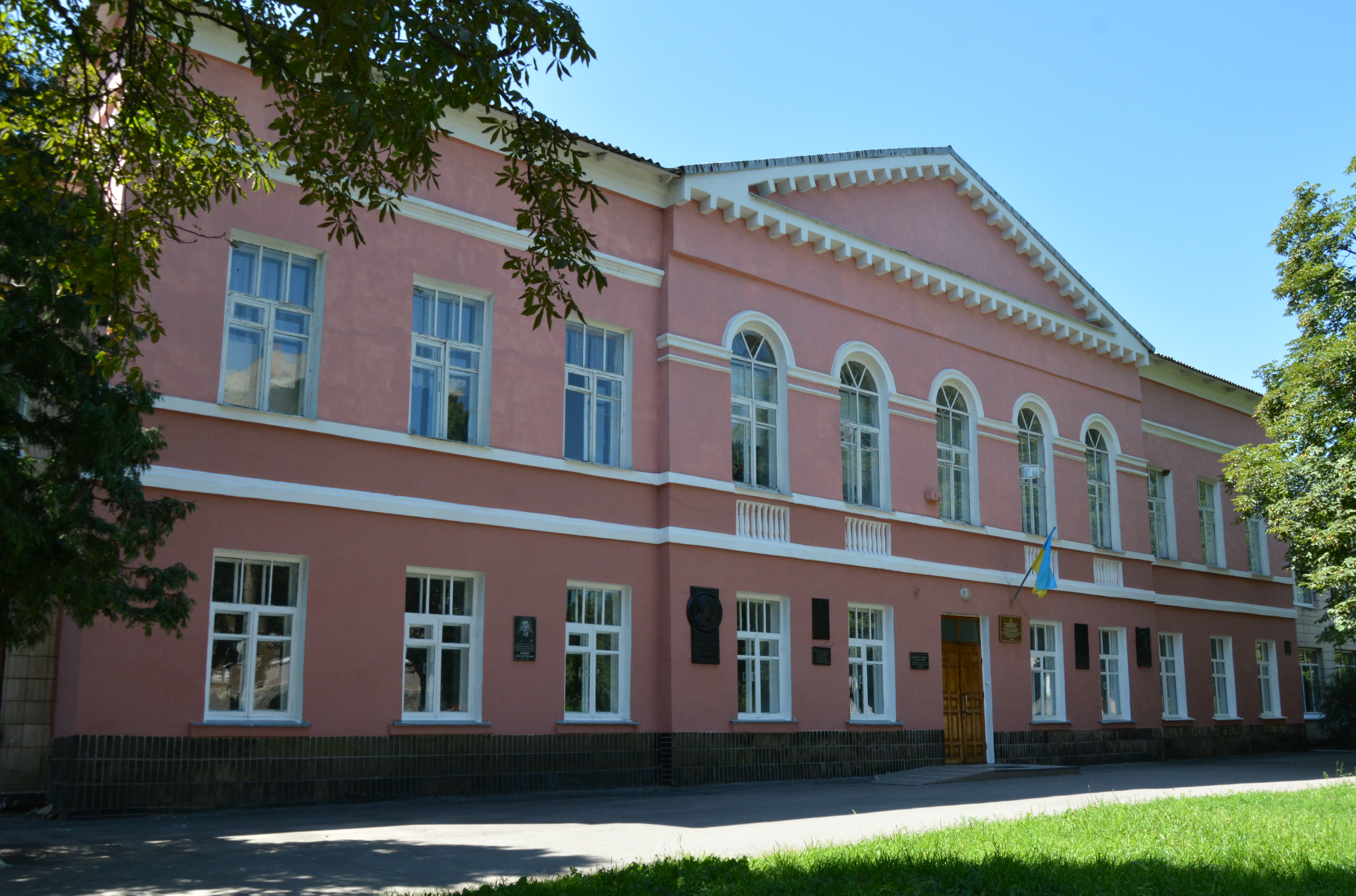
High school building

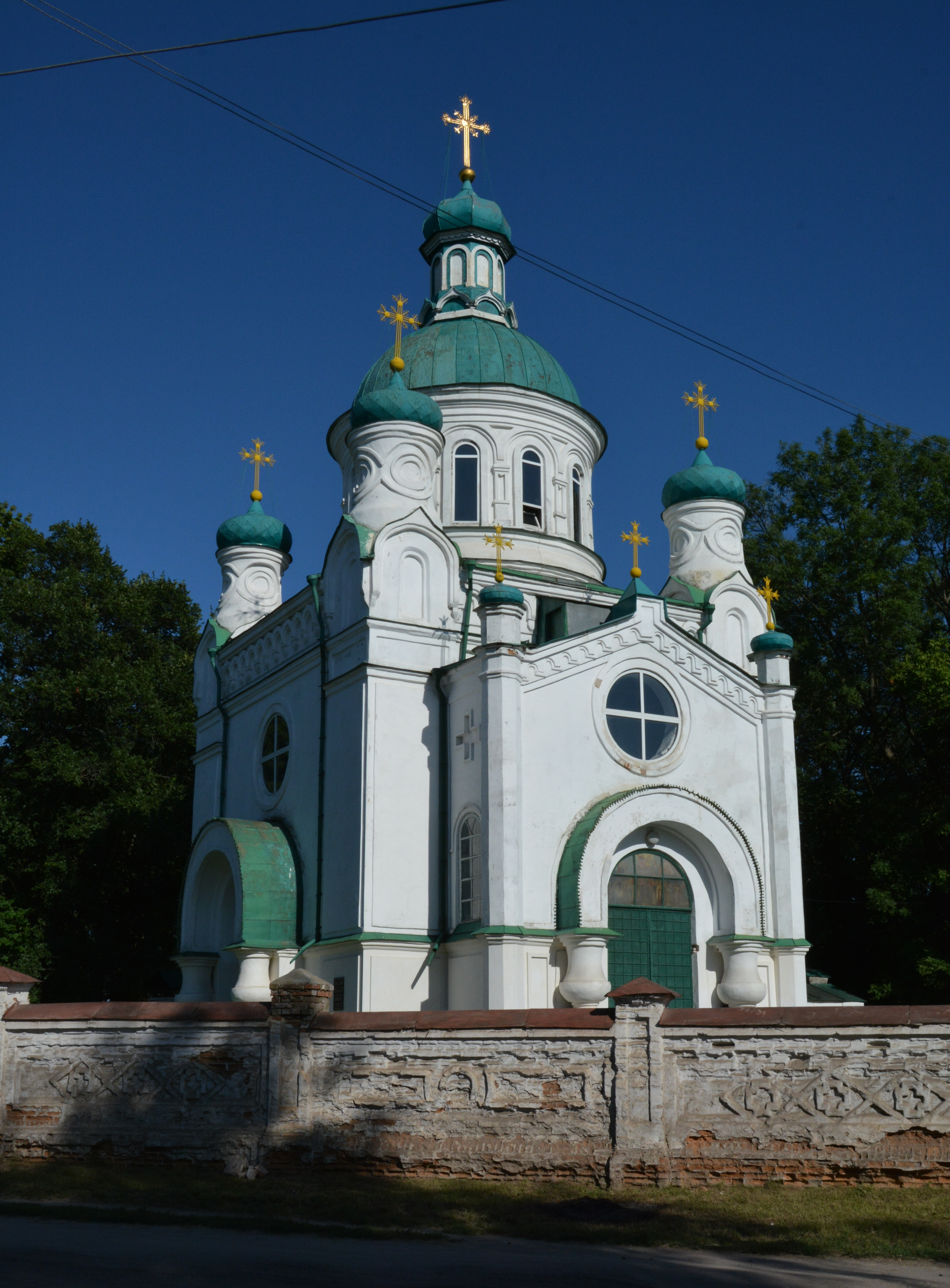
Church of All Saints in Romny

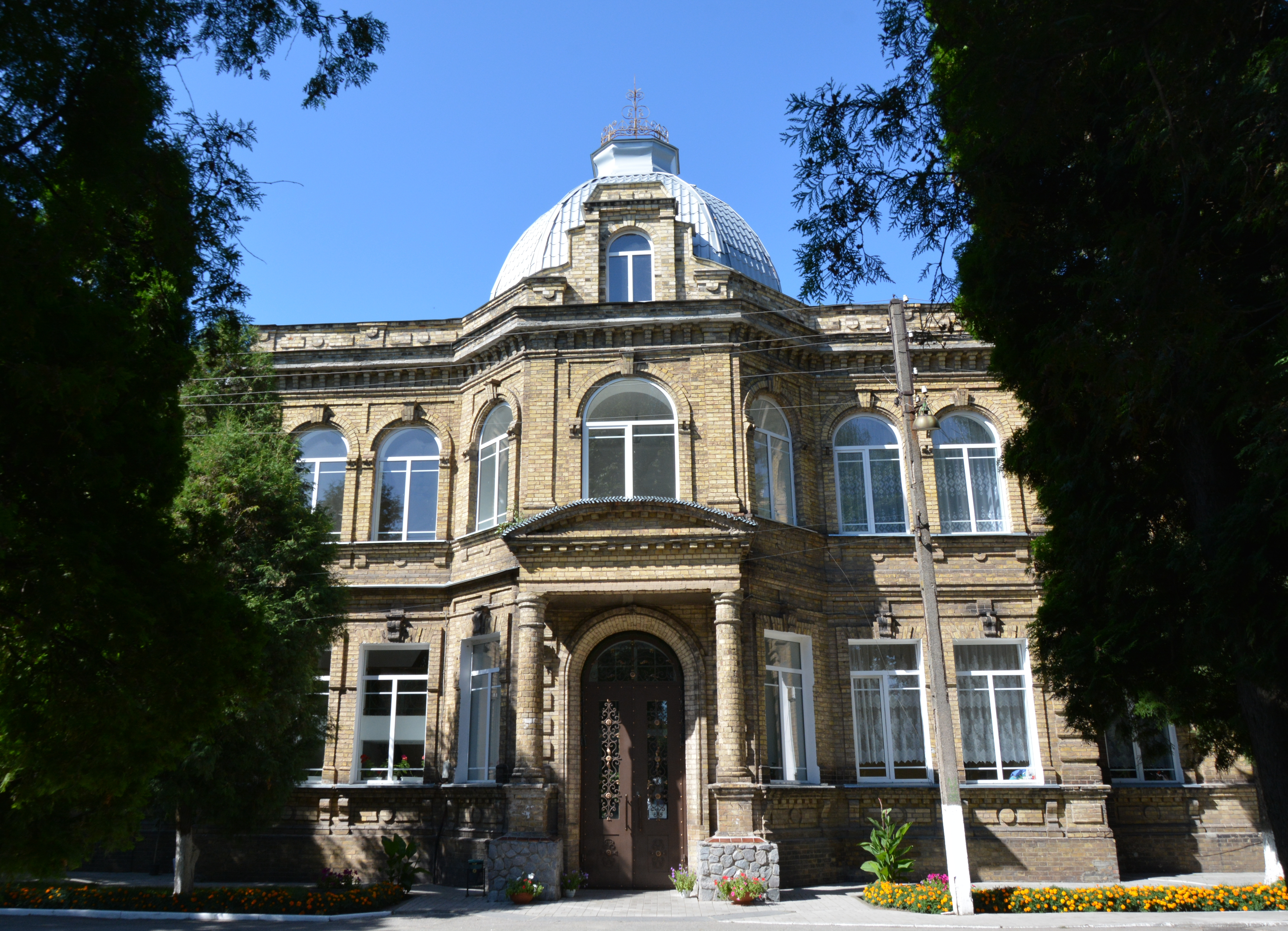
Historic hospital building

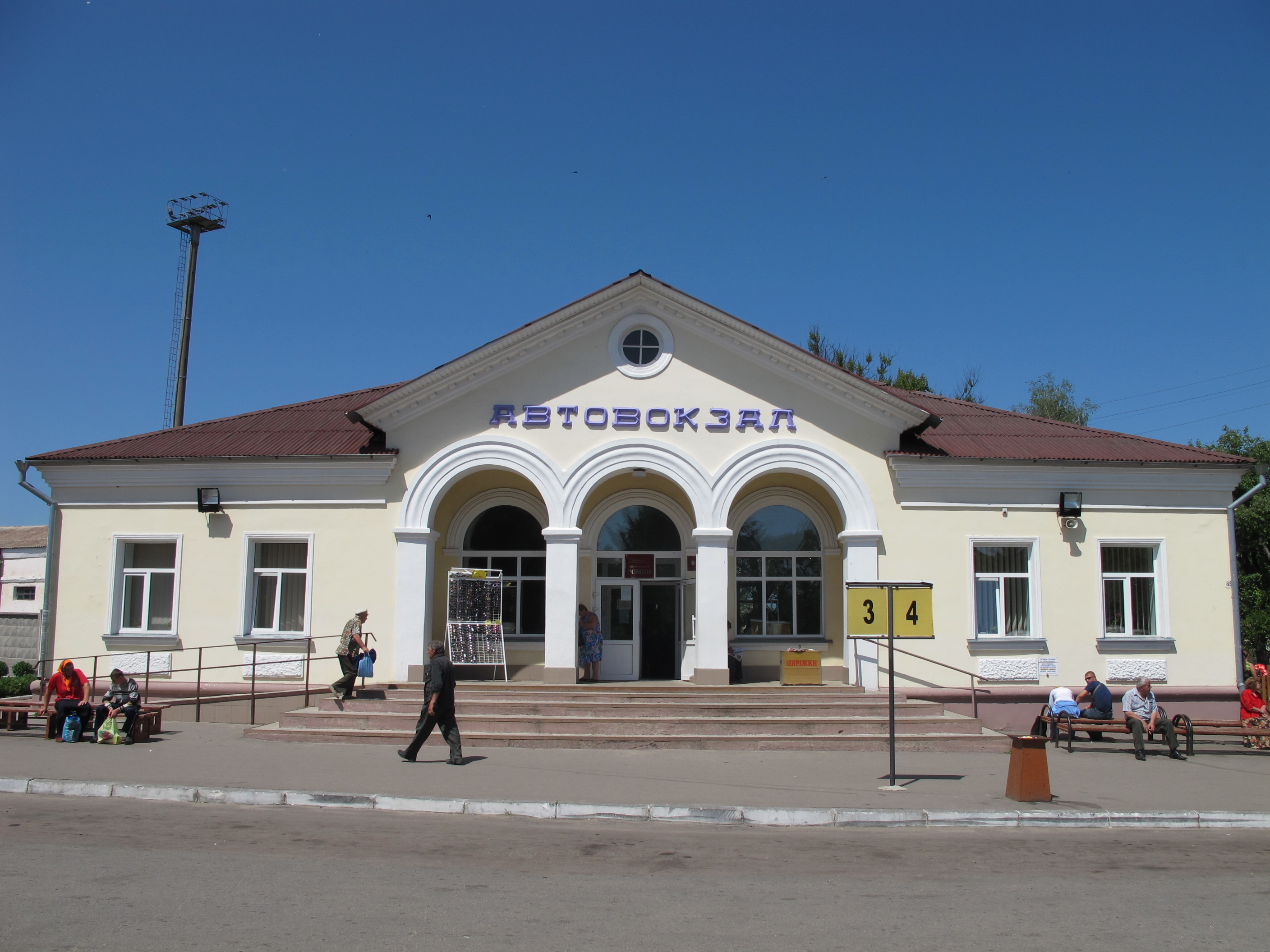
Bus station in Romny
