= Arkhyp Teslenko =

Arkhyp Teslenko Архип Тесленко
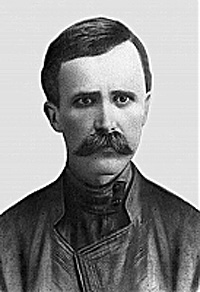
- Born: March 2, 1882; Kharkivtsi, Lokhvitsky Uyezd, Poltava Governorate, Russian Empire
- Died: 28 June 1911 (aged 29); Kharkivtsi, Lokhvitsky Uyezd, Poltava Governorate, Russian Empire
- Citizenship: Russian Empire
- Occupations: Writer, poet, dramatist
- Writing career
- Language: Ukrainian, Russian
- Period: 1902-1911
- Genres: Poetry, drama, short story
- Movements: Realism, impressionism

Arkhyp Yukhymovych Teslenko (Ukrainian: Архип Юхимович Тесленко; 2 March (O.S. 18 February) 1882–28 (15) June 1911) was a Ukrainian writer, poet and dramatist. Known as an author of socially critical prose with impressionist elements, he dedicated much of his work to the problems of Ukrainian peasantry in the environment of Tsarist oppression. During the Russian Revolution of 1905, Teslenko himself joined the ranks of peasant insurgents, and as a result spent several years under arrest and in exile, which contributed to his early death.

== Biography ==
Teslenko was born in the village of Kharkivtsi, then part of the Lokhvytsia povit of Poltava Governorate (now Poltava Oblast, Ukraine). He came from a poor peasant family and received his primary education in a parish school. In 1894 he enrolled into a teachers' seminary, but was soon expelled for "freethought". After his expulsion, Teslenko provided his living as a hired labourer, and spent some time as a scribe's aide and a trainee of a notary in Lokhvytsia. He eventually applied for a training course as telegraph operator in Dolynska, but was forced to abandon it due to poor eyesight.

After returning to his native village, Teslenko organized an amateur drama troupe, producing plays by Taras Shevchenko, Marko Kropyvnytskyi and Ivan Karpenko-Karyi. He also took part in the organization of theatrical performances at the Lokhvytsia People's House.

During the Revolution of 1905-1907, Teslenko organized a revolutionary circle, spreading banned publications and taking part in activities of the Peasant Spilka. In late 1905 he took part in a peasant uprising in the area of Lokhvytsia and was soon arrested. In the autumn of 1906 Teslenko was arrested a second time for his participation in clandestine peasant organizations and exiled to Vologda, and then to Vyatka Governorate. After spending two years in exile, in 1910 Teslenko was allowed to return to his native village, but his health had already been severely damaged by harsh conditions under arrest. Suffering from tuberculosis, he died in Kharkivtsi.

== Literary works ==
Second volume of Teslenko's stories published in 1918 in Poltava

In 1902 Teslenko made his first attempts as writer, creating several poems in the Russian language. In 1903 he authored a Russian-language drama, but soon transferred to writing in Ukrainian. Teslenko began writing prose stories in 1904, and starting from 1906 they were published in several Ukrainian magazines and newspapers. Following his exile, he also created several autobiographic stories. Teslenko was also a regular contributor of Kyiv-based Rada and Selo newspapers.

Teslenko's realistic texts contain sharp criticism of social conditions in the village. Typical heroes of his stories are poor people, whose dreams for a better future are ruined by the realities of their time. His last work, A Wasted Life (1910) depicts the tragic fate of a talented village girl from a poor family, who became a teacher but was eventually driven to suicide. Another topic present in Teslenko's works is the alienation of official Orthodoxy from the lives of Ukrainian population.

According to literary critics, Teslenko's writing was influenced both by traditions of classical Ukrainian literature, especially works of Marko Vovchok, as well as by elements of Impressionism. Some of his later texts are stylistically close to early works by Volodymyr Vynnychenko.

== Legacy and commemoration ==
Teslenko's works have seen numerous posthumous publications. A memorial museum dedicated to the writer has been established in Kharkivtsi, and a monument to him exists in Lokhvytsia.
