= Leonid Hlibov =

Ukrainian writer (1827–1893)

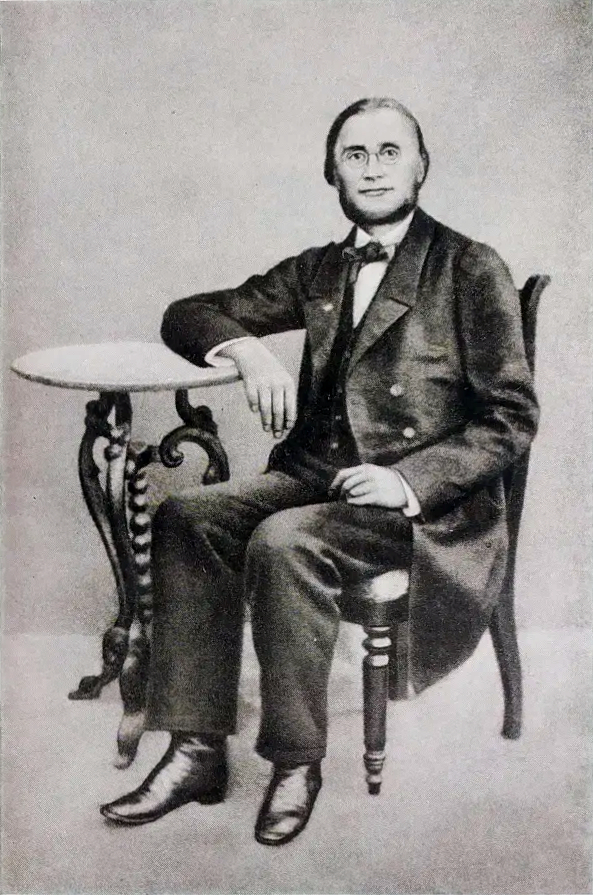
Hlibov in 1864

Leonid Ivanovych Hlibov (Ukrainian: Леонід Іванович Глібов [leoˈn⁽ʲ⁾id iˈwɑnowɪdʒ‿ˈɦl⁽ʲ⁾ibou̯]; 5 March 1827 – 10 November 1893) was a Ukrainian poet, writer, teacher, and civic figure.

== Life ==
Hlibov was born in Veselyi Podil, Khorolsky Uyezd, Poltava Governorate, Russian Empire. He graduated from the Nizhyn Lyceum in 1855. In 1858, he began to teach at the gymnasia in Chornyi Ostriv and Chernihiv. He was active in the Chernihiv Hromada, published educational books, and contributed to the Saint Petersburg Ukrainian journal Osnova.

In 1861, he founded and became editor of the weekly newspaper Chernigovskii listok, in which he published some of his works. In 1863, the Russian authorities closed down the paper and banned his works. Hlibov was then fired from his teaching job and was forced to live under police surveillance. From 1867 to his death, he was the director of the Chernihiv zemstvo printing house. He died in Chernihiv.

== Works ==
Hlibov wrote over 40 romantic lyric poems in the Ukrainian language. His poem "Zhurba" (Sorrow), was used by Mykola Lysenko and has become a popular Ukrainian folk song.

His most important and notable works are his 107 fables. These are written in the vernacular and satirize contemporary life and conditions using Ukrainian motifs and folklore. Hlibov also wrote riddles for children.
