= 1925 Soviet Union local elections =

Local elections were held in the Soviet Union in 1925. They were held as a result of low turnout in the 1924 elections causing the results in 40% of rural districts to be invalid, as a 50% turnout was required.

The Communist Party suffered a setback during the elections as Communists were voted out of soviets in different regions. This contributed to rising calls for peasant unions modelled after the earlier All-Russian Peasant Union.

According to Soviet law, multiple groups out of the eligible adult voting population were disenfranchised from all elections for various reasons.
