= Poltava Province =

Poltava Province may refer to:

- Poltava Oblast, subdivision of Ukraine
- Poltava Governorate, subdivision of the Russian Empire
