= Konstantinogradsky Uyezd =

Konstantinogradsky Uyezd Константиноградъ уѣздъ
- Uezd
- Coat of arms

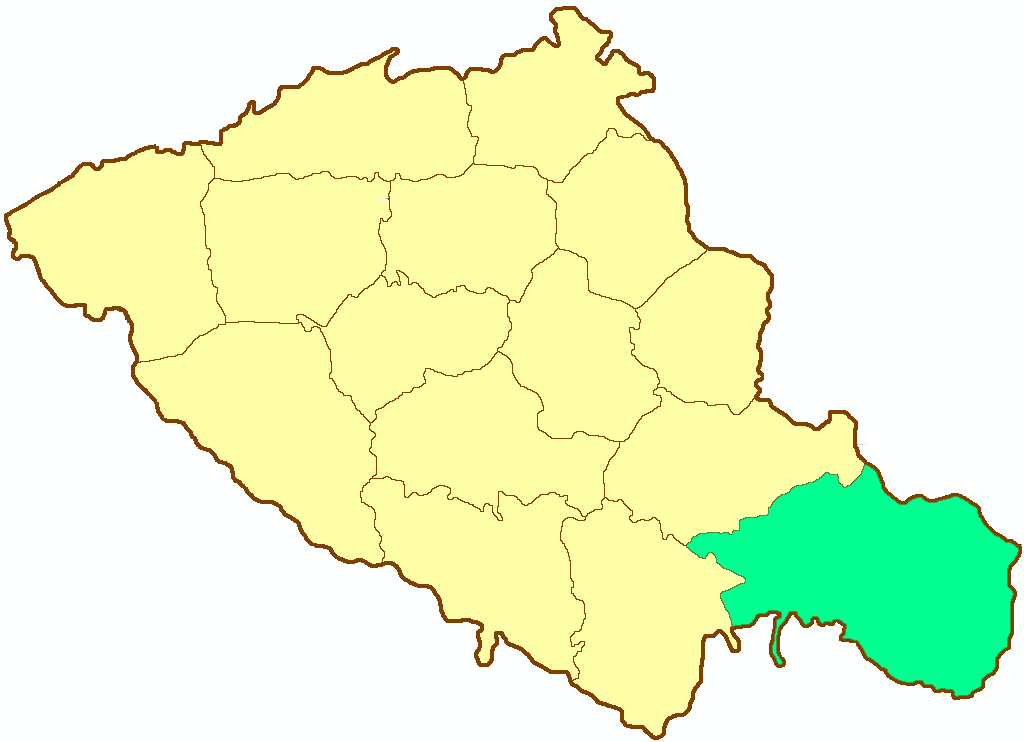
- Location in the Poltava Governorate
- Country: Russian Empire
- Governorate: Poltava
- Established: 1781
- Abolished: 1923
- Capital: Konstantinograd

Population (1897)
  - Total: 230,310

Konstantinogradsky Uyezd (Константиноградский уезд) was one of the subdivisions of the Poltava Governorate of the Russian Empire. It was situated in the southeastern part of the governorate. Its administrative centre was Konstantinograd (present-day Krasnohrad).

== Demographics ==
At the time of the Russian Empire Census of 1897, Konstantinogradsky Uyezd had a population of 230,310. Of these, 86.1% spoke Ukrainian, 11.8% spoke Russian, 1.1% spoke German, 0.9% spoke Yiddish and 0.1% spoke Belarusian as their native language.
