= Zenkovsky Uyezd =

Uyezd of Poltava Governorate, Russian Empire

Zenkovsky Uyezd Зеньковъ уѣздъ
- Uezd
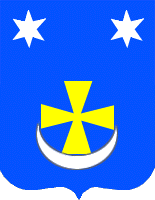
- Coat of arms

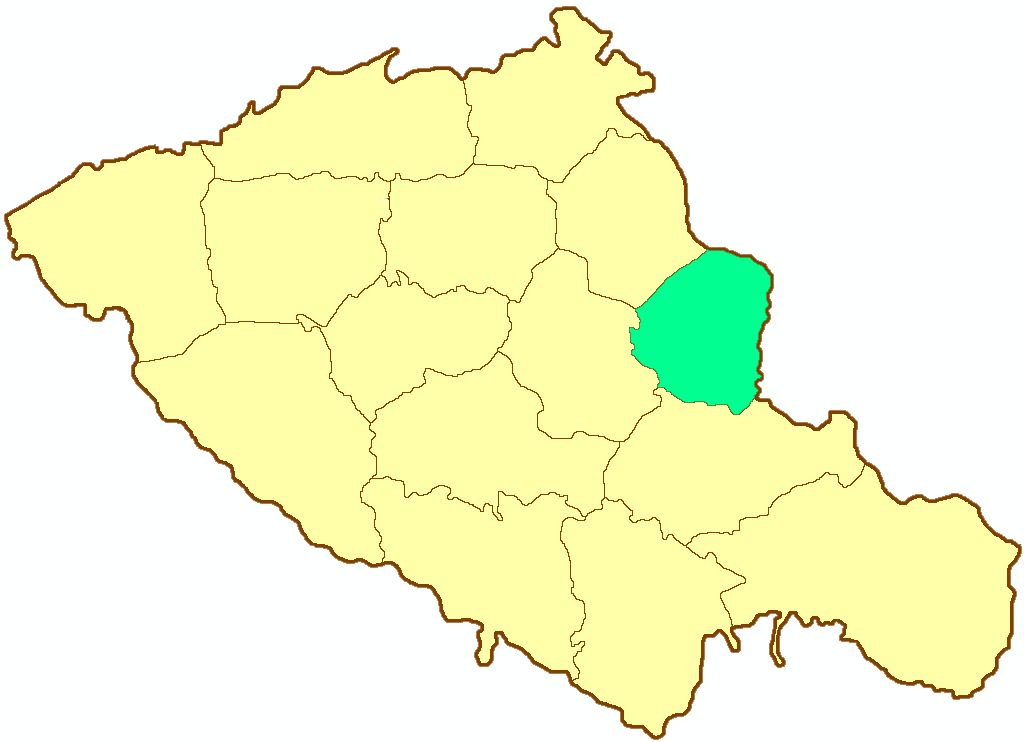
- Location in the Poltava Governorate
- Country: Russian Empire
- Governorate: Poltava
- Established: 1781
- Abolished: 1923
- Capital: Zinkiv

Population (1897)
  - Total: 140,304

The uyezd was created in 1781 within the Chernigov Viceroyalty out of parts of Hadiach Regiment which contained territory of former Zinkiv Regiment. In 1796 the uyezd was dissolved and its territory was included into the revived Little Russia Governorate. In 1803 the uyezd was reinstated already within the Poltava Governorate. In 1923 the uyezd was liquidated with introductions of raions.

== Demographics ==
At the time of the Russian Empire Census of 1897, Zenkovsky Uyezd had a population of 140,304. Of these, 98.1% spoke Ukrainian, 1.3% Yiddish and 0.5% Russian as their native language.
