= Romensky Uyezd =

Romnsky Uyezd Ромны уѣздъ
- Uezd
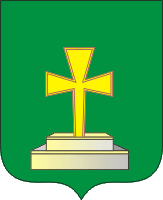
- Coat of arms

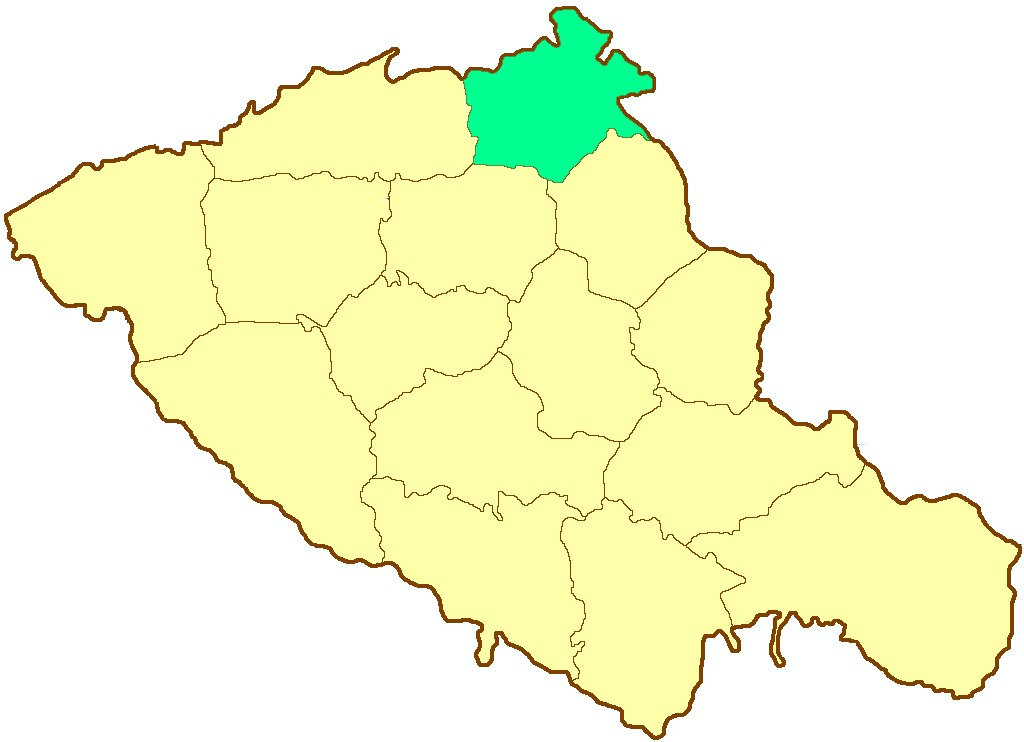
- Location in the Poltava Governorate
- Country: Russian Empire
- Governorate: Poltava
- Established: 1781
- Abolished: 1923
- Capital: Romny

Population (1897)
  - Total: 186,497

Romensky Uyezd (Russian: Роменский уезд, Ukrainian: Роменський повіт) was one of the subdivisions of the Poltava Governorate of the Russian Empire. It was situated in the northern part of the governorate. Its administrative centre was Romny.

== Demographics ==
At the time of the Russian Empire Census of 1897, Romensky Uyezd had a population of 186,497. Of these, 93.5% spoke Ukrainian, 4.2% Yiddish, 1.7% Russian, 0.3% German, 0.2% Polish and 0.1% Belarusian as their native language.
