= Poltavsky Uyezd =

Poltavsky Uyezd Полтава уѣздъ
- Uezd
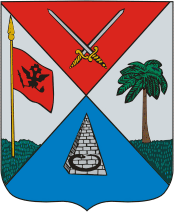
- Coat of arms

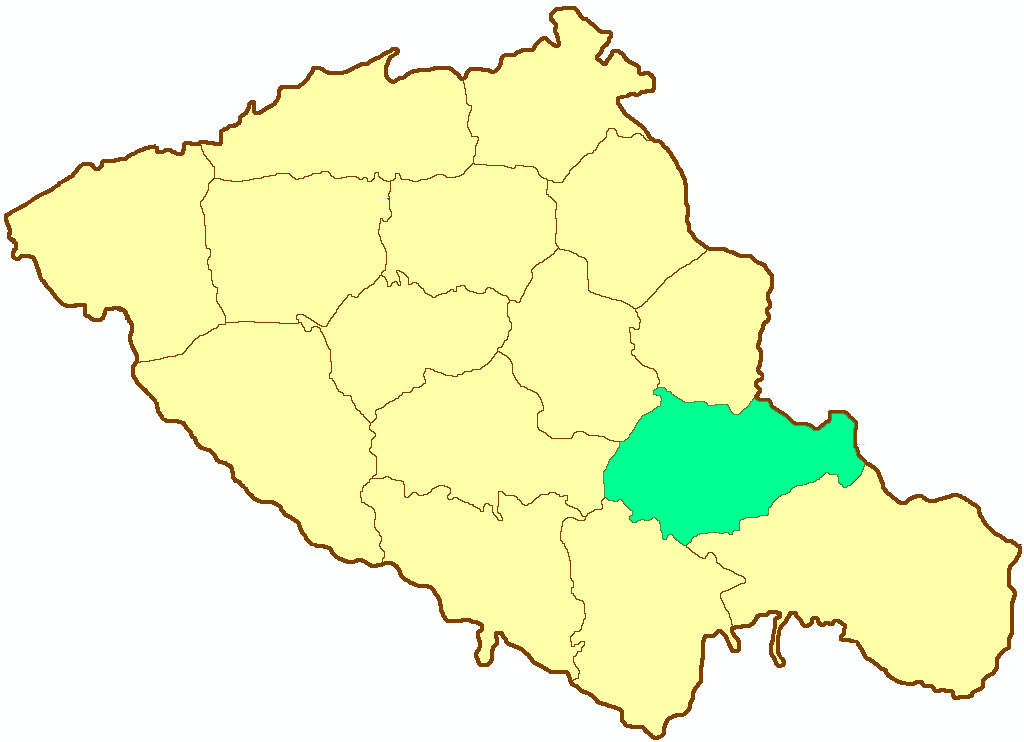
- Location in the Poltava Governorate
- Country: Russian Empire
- Governorate: Poltava
- Established: 1781
- Abolished: 1923
- Capital: Poltava

Population (1897)
  - Total: 227,795

Poltavsky Uyezd (Полтавский уезд) was one of the subdivisions of the Poltava Governorate of the Russian Empire. It was situated in the southeastern part of the governorate. Its administrative centre was Poltava.

== Demographics ==
At the time of the Russian Empire Census of 1897, Poltavsky Uyezd had a population of 227,795. Of these, 88.7% spoke Ukrainian, 5.3% Russian, 5.1% Yiddish, 0.5% Polish, 0.2% German, 0.1% Tatar and 0.1% Belarusian as their native language.
