= Piryatinsky Uyezd =

Subdivision of the Russian Empire

Piryatinsky Uyezd Пирятинъ уѣздъ
- Uezd
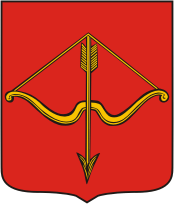
- Coat of arms

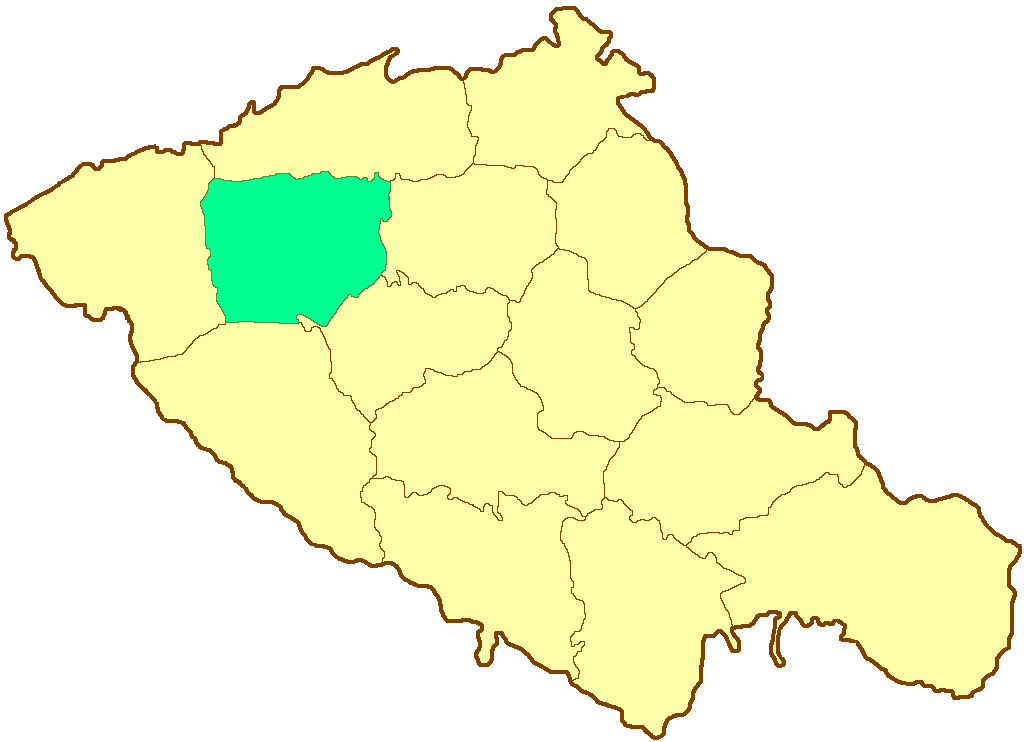
- Location in the Poltava Governorate
- Country: Russian Empire
- Governorate: Poltava
- Established: 1781
- Abolished: 1923
- Capital: Piryatin

Population (1897)
  - Total: 163,505

Piryatinsky Uyezd (Пирятинский уезд) was one of the subdivisions of the Poltava Governorate of the Russian Empire. It was situated in the northwestern part of the governorate. Its administrative centre was Piryatin (Pyriatyn).

== Demographics ==
At the time of the Russian Empire Census of 1897, Piryatinsky Uyezd had a population of 163,505. Of these, 95.2% spoke Ukrainian, 3.8% Yiddish and 0.9% Russian as their native language.
