= Pereyaslavsky Uyezd =

Pereyaslavsky Uyezd Переяславль уѣздъ
- Uezd
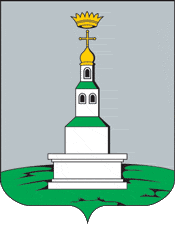
- Coat of arms

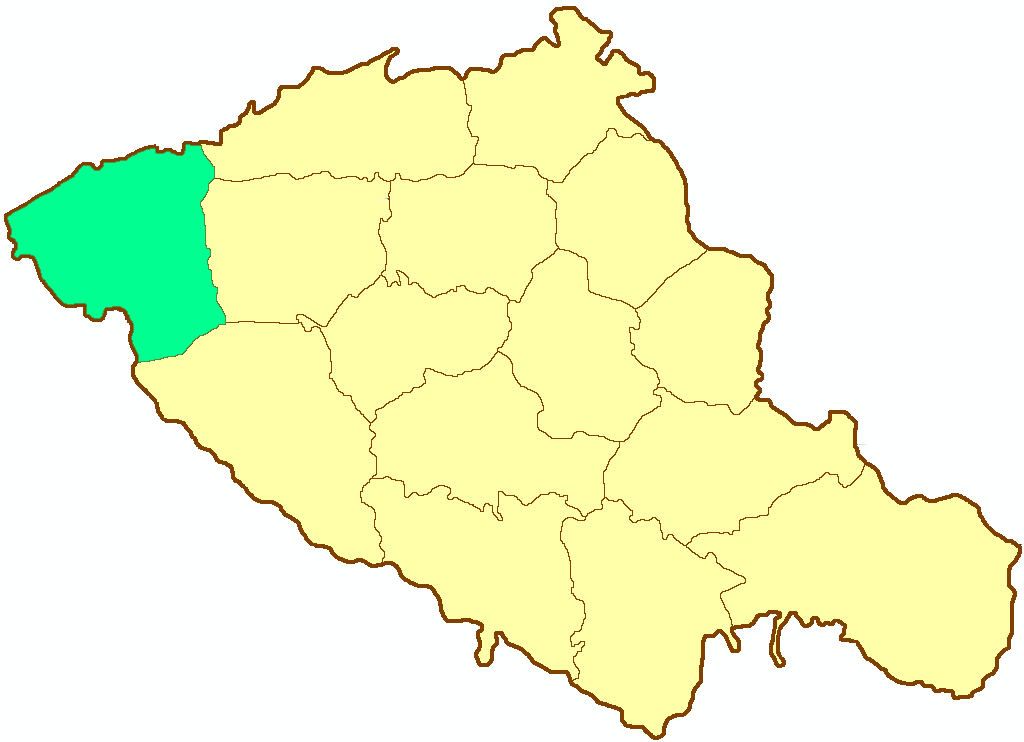
- Location in the Poltava Governorate
- Country: Russian Empire
- Governorate: Poltava
- Established: 1781
- Abolished: 1923
- Capital: Pereyaslavl'

Population (1897)
  - Total: 185,306

Pereyaslavsky Uyezd (Russian: Переяславский уезд, romanized: Pereyaslavskiy uyezd) was one of the subdivisions of the Poltava Governorate of the Russian Empire. It was situated in the northwestern part of the governorate. Its administrative centre was Pereyaslavl.

== Demographics ==
At the time of the Russian Empire Census of 1897, Pereyaslavsky Uyezd had a population of 185,306. Of these, 93.8% spoke Ukrainian, 5.3% Yiddish, 0.8% Russian and 0.1% Polish as their native language.
