= All-Russian Peasant Union =

Historic revolutionary organization in Russia

The All-Russian Peasant Union (Russian: Всероссийский крестьянский союз, romanized: Vserossiyskiy krest'yanskiy soyuz, VKS) was a mass revolutionary organization uniting the peasantry and the rural intelligentsia, which arose at the height of the Russian Revolution of 1905.

== Origin ==
In the spring of 1905, the Moscow Governor attempted to call on some peasant societies in the Moscow province to compile patriotic addresses with an expression of readiness to continue the Russian-Japanese war. This initiative led to the opposite result – many societies of the Moscow region peasants began to write letters of opposite content. Under the influence of some members of the Socialist-Revolutionary Party in May 1905, a peasant congress was organized in Moscow in order to agree and coordinate efforts in this direction. During this period, several similar professional congresses took place in Russia. The Peasant Union of the Moscow Province was formed at the Moscow Congress. During the summer of 1905, similar alliances arose in other provinces of the Russian Empire.

== Founding Congress ==
From July 31 to August 1, 1905, the Constituent (the first one) congress of the All-Russian Peasant Union was held in Moscow. It was illegal, the delegates gathered in private apartments. Among them were representatives of peasant unions of 22 provinces, mainly central and purely Russian. At the congress there were more than 100 people, including about 25 rural intellectuals (Social Revolutionaries, Liberators and several Social Democrats).

The congress proclaimed itself the first Constituent Congress of the All-Russian Peasant Union. They determined the structure of the All-Russian Peasant Union: it included periodic conventions (All-Russian, regional, provincial) and committees (Main, provincial, district, volost and rural). The congress elected the Main Committee, which included 8 people (Semyon and Vasily Mazurenko, Vasily Krasnov, Sergey Kournin, Medvedev, Ovcharenko, Grigory Shaposhnikov, Khomutov), as well as the "Central Assistance Bureau" composed of Stepan Bleklov, Alexander Levitsky, Alexey Staal, Vladimir Tan-Bogoraz, Arkhyp Teslenko.

The congress participants recognized the necessity of convening a Constituent Assembly elected by universal direct, equal and secret ballot, the requirement of voting rights for women was unanimously adopted; age limit determined by a majority of 20 years; the idea of a two-step election provoked a strong protest. Further, it was decided to require compulsory and free education, and schools should be secular; the teaching of the law of God was deemed unnecessary; teaching was to be conducted in the local national languages; the period of study was to be at least 5 years. Local government should be widely developed and built on the principle of universal suffrage. The congress advocated the nationalization of the land and the abolition of private land ownership; monastic, church, specific, cabinet and state lands should have been selected without redemption; land should be taken away from private owners by part for remuneration, part without remuneration; the conditions for the nationalization of the land should be determined by the constituent assembly. The program of the congress was very close to the program of the Socialist Revolutionary Party.

The proposal of the representative of the Russian Social Democratic Labour Party, Andrey Shestakov, to include in the resolution an item on a democratic republic was rejected. The leadership of the Union and most of the delegates were supporters of peaceful means and opposed the armed struggle.

According to the materials of the constituent congress, the main committee of the All-Russian Peasant Union published a brochure: "The Constituent Congress of the All-Russian Peasant Union. Protocol" (Moscow, 1905). In the same year of 1905 in St. Petersburg, it was also implemented in the form of a brochure and another edition of the same protocol. Although this edition was attended by some interesting details that were not in the first brochure, but the Committee of the Peasant Union took responsibility only for the first, official publication.

== Delegate convention ==
From November 6 to 10, 1905, in the new political conditions, that is, the first regular (or second) congress (or delegate meeting) of the Peasant Union was held legally in Moscow. Sessions were held in the building of the agricultural school. Attended by 187 delegates (including 145 peasants) from 27 provinces, including delegates from Belarus, who were completely absent at the first congress. Among the delegates there was a large number of rural intellectuals. The general tone that prevailed at the congress was still much more radical than at the constituent congress. In particular, it was decided:

1. Do not submit rural and parish verdicts for approval by the Zemstvo bosses, but bring them into effect according to the decrees of the assemblies.
2. Do not contact the Zemsky heads in any matters.
3. Do not give officials and police a carriage, apartments, travel money, do not send sots and ten according to the requirements of the authorities.
4. Change all local peasant authorities (foremen, wardens, clerks) and choose new ones, while choosing universal direct, equal and secret ballot, giving everyone the right to vote in the parish without distinction of gender, ethnicity, religion or class.
5. Do not pay taxes.
6. Refuse to testify at interrogations.
7. When the people achieve the power to insist on the payment of % for all state loans concluded before November 10, 1905, but to consider all loans that are concluded by the government after November 10 before the Constituent Assembly is illegal and non-refundable.

== Further activities during the first Russian revolution ==
According to incomplete data, by October-December 1905, in the European part of Russia there were already 470 volost and rural organizations of the All-Russian Peasant Union, uniting up to 200 thousand people. Organizations also originated in Siberia and the Far East.

At the end of 1905, several regional, 10 provincial and 30 district congresses of the Peasant Union were held. Some Congresses have put forward a program of armed seizure of landed estates. The local organizations of the Union in the areas of mass peasant unrest (Ukraine, the Volga region, the Center of the European part) played the role of revolutionary Peasant committees.

In March 1906, an illegal congress of the Union took place in Moscow, and 18 provinces were represented there.

With the beginning of the work of the 1st State Duma, the activities of the Union focused around the "Labor Group". Union committees began to be viewed as grassroots bodies of the group, supporting it with instructions and agitation in the peasantry. In May 1906, a meeting of the Union was held in Helsingfors, which approved these tactics and decided to prepare an armed uprising in alliance with the revolutionary parties.

The Peasant Union took part in the elections to the Second Duma and held there several of its members who joined it in the Labor Group.

Individual members of the Union were subjected to political persecution in 1905. Against the Union itself, repressions began in 1906, the organizers of the Union Anikin, Professor Anichkov, Mazurenko and others were arrested. The Union’s bureaucracy continued to operate for a while, however, its activities gradually calmed down and finally ceased by the end of 1908. Arrests for membership in the All-Russian Peasant Union continued in 1914. Some representatives of this organization abroad formed the Foreign Bureau of the Peasant Union, and the Mensheviks were included in it.

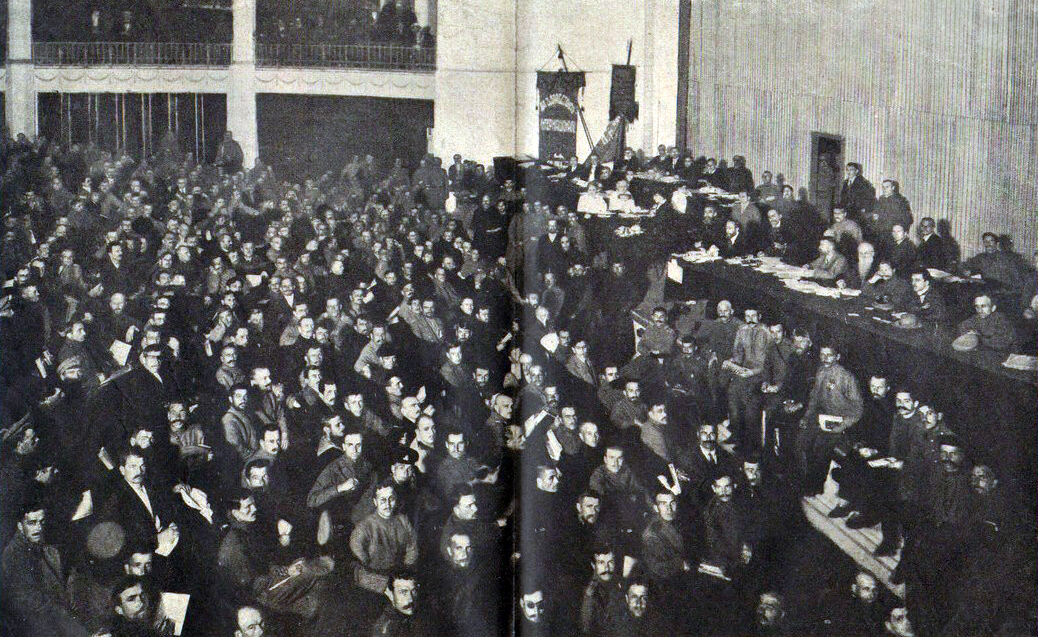
First Peasant Congress (May 1917)

== The resumption of the All-Russian Peasant Union in 1917 ==
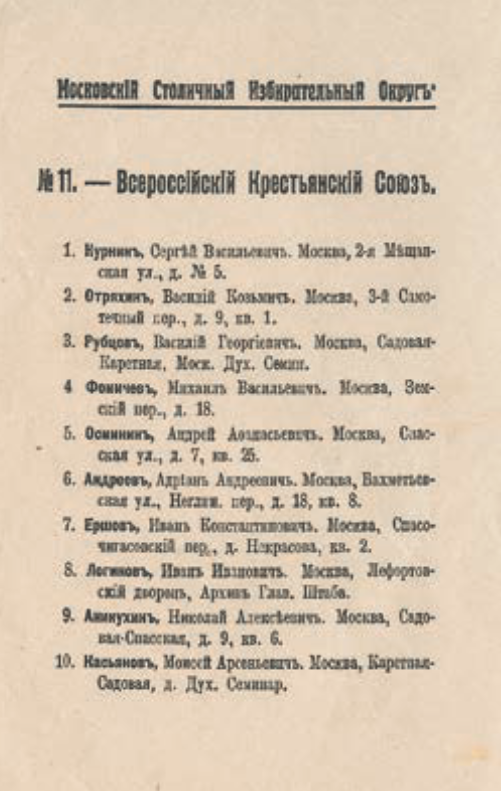
VKS list for the 1917 Russian Constituent Assembly election

The activities of the All-Russian Peasant Union resumed after the February 1917 revolution. In March, a part of the former leaders of the Union, representatives of the Popular Socialists, the Social Revolutionaries, the Mensheviks, and the cooperative movement formed the Main Committee. On March 25, 1917, the Main Committee issued an appeal calling on the peasants to support the Provisional Government, suspend the seizures of landlords and support the continuation of the war.

From August 13 to 19, a congress of the Union was held in Moscow. It was attended by 316 delegates from 33 provinces and regions of European Russia and Siberia and 34 delegates of military units. At the congress there was a split. Representatives of the All-Russian and Moscow Council of Peasant Deputies, dominated by the Social Revolutionaries, accused the Main Committee of the All-Russian Peasant Union of destroying unity and creating a second, parallel to the Councils, peasant organization. Supporters of the peasant councils, and with them a significant part of the delegates left the congress.

At the congress, 120-140 delegates remained. They adopted a new statute, declaring the All-Russian Peasant Union "a broad professional-political organization of the peasantry", it was emphasized that the Peasant Councils are essentially a Social Revolutionary organization. A main committee of 25 people was elected (with chairman Semen Mazurenko). The program of the Union included the socialization of the land with the transition to the free use of the people; the redemption of landowner lands was provided for in an indirect form, namely in the form of payment of mortgages on the land by the state. The final decision of the land issue was provided to the Constituent Assembly. The congress spoke out against the seizures of landowner lands, supported the Provisional Government, called for a defense policy, supported the dissolution of the Finnish Diet.

In April-October 1917, the newspaper "Voice of the Peasant Union", the publication of the All-Russian Peasant Union, was published.

In the Bolshevik time, the Union ceased to exist.

== Sources ==
- Andrey Shestakov. All-Russian Peasant Union // Marxist Historian. 1927. Volume 5. Pages 95–123.
- Mikhail Vasilyev-Uzhin. In the fire of the first revolution. Moscow — Leningrad, 1931;
- Kiryukhina. All-Russian Peasant Union in 1905. // Historical notes. Volume 50. 1955. Pages 95–141.
