= Mirgorodsky Uyezd =

Subdivision of the former Russian Empire

Mirgorodsky Uyezd Миргородъ уѣздъ
- Uezd
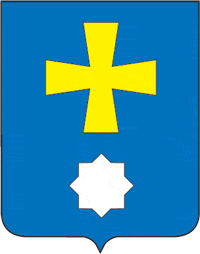
- Coat of arms

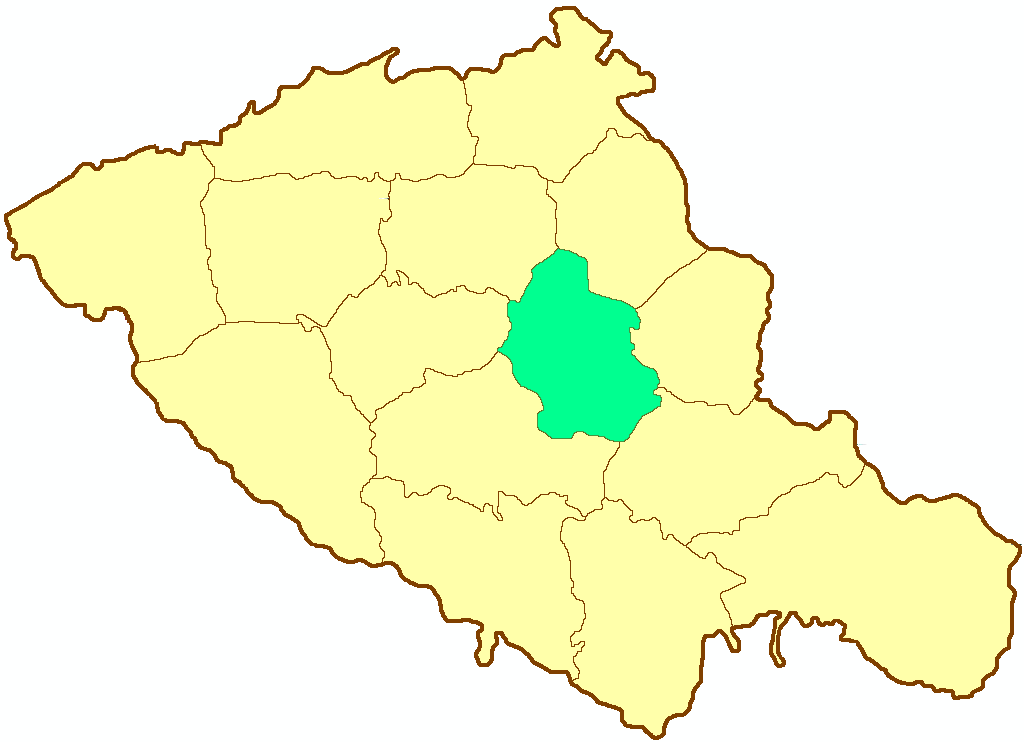
- Location in the Poltava Governorate
- Country: Russian Empire
- Governorate: Poltava
- Established: 1781
- Abolished: 1923
- Capital: Mirgorod

Population (1897)
  - Total: 157,790

Mirgorodsky Uyezd (Миргородский уезд) was one of the subdivisions of the Poltava Governorate of the Russian Empire. It was situated in the central part of the governorate. Its administrative centre was Mirgorod (Myrhorod).

== Demographics ==
At the time of the Russian Empire Census of 1897, Mirgorodsky Uyezd had a population of 157,790. Of these, 97.1% spoke Ukrainian, 1.9% Yiddish and 0.9% Russian as their native language.
