= Gadyachsky Uyezd =

Subdivision of Poltava Governate, Russian Empire

Gadyachsky Uyezd Гадячъ уѣздъ
- Uezd
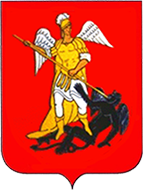
- Coat of arms

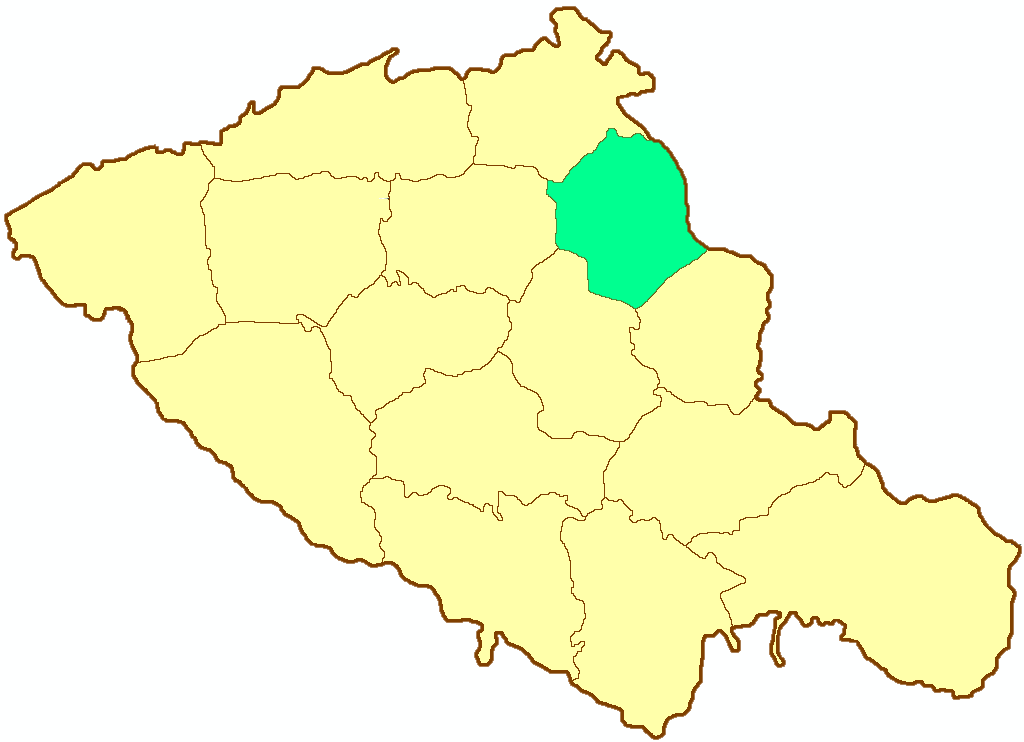
- Location in the Poltava Governorate
- Country: Russian Empire
- Governorate: Poltava
- Established: 1781
- Abolished: 1923
- Capital: Gadyach

Population (1897)
  - Total: 142,806

Gadyachsky Uyezd (Гадячский уезд) was one of the subdivisions of the Poltava Governorate of the Russian Empire. It was situated in the northeastern part of the governorate. Its administrative centre was Gadyach (Hadiach).

== Demographics ==
At the time of the Russian Empire Census of 1897, Gadyachsky Uyezd had a population of 142,806. Of these, 96.9% spoke Ukrainian, 2.4% Yiddish, 0.6% Russian and 0.1% Polish as their native language.
