= Lubensky Uyezd =

Subdivision of the Poltava Governorate of the Russian Empire

Lubensky Uyezd Лубны уѣздъ
- Uezd
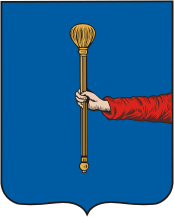
- Coat of arms

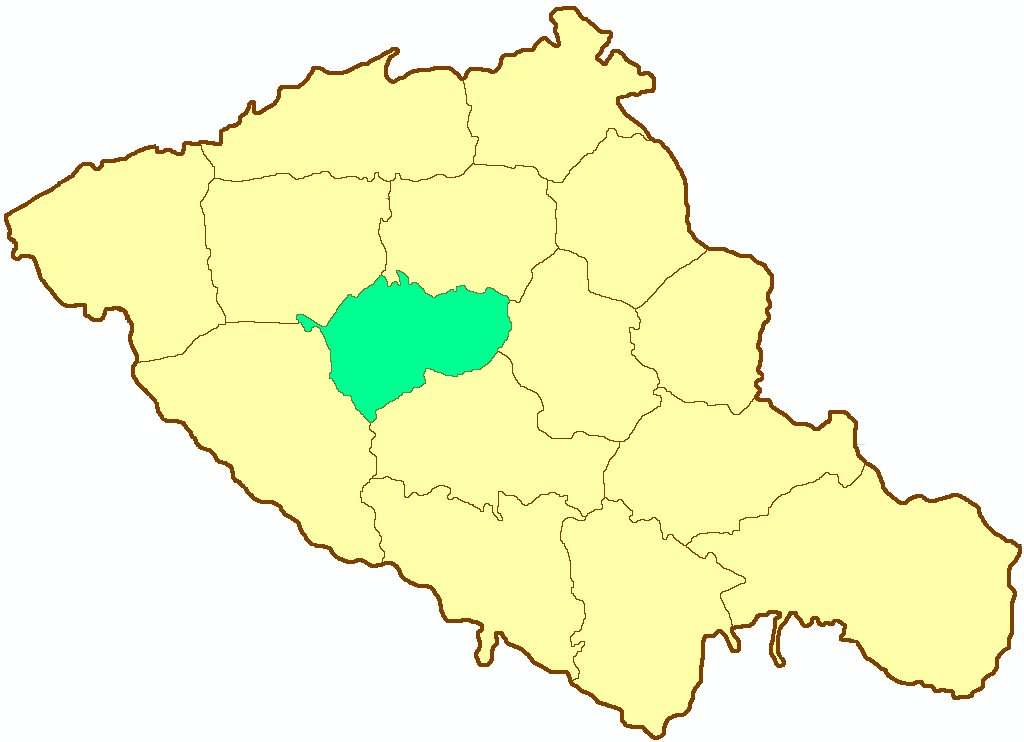
- Location in the Poltava Governorate
- Country: Russian Empire
- Governorate: Poltava
- Established: 1781
- Abolished: 1923
- Capital: Lubny

Population (1897)
  - Total: 136,613

Lubensky Uyezd (Лубенский уезд) was one of the subdivisions of the Poltava Governorate of the Russian Empire. It was situated in the central part of the governorate. Its administrative centre was Lubny.

== Demographics ==
At the time of the Russian Empire Census of 1897, Lubensky Uyezd had a population of 136,613. Of these, 95.0% spoke Ukrainian, 3.3% Yiddish, 1.4% Russian, 0.1% Polish, 0.1% Belarusian and 0.1% German as their native language.
