= Khorolsky Uyezd =

Khorolsky Uyezd Хороль уѣздъ
- Uezd
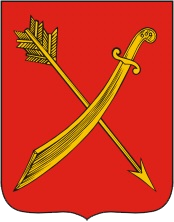
- Coat of arms

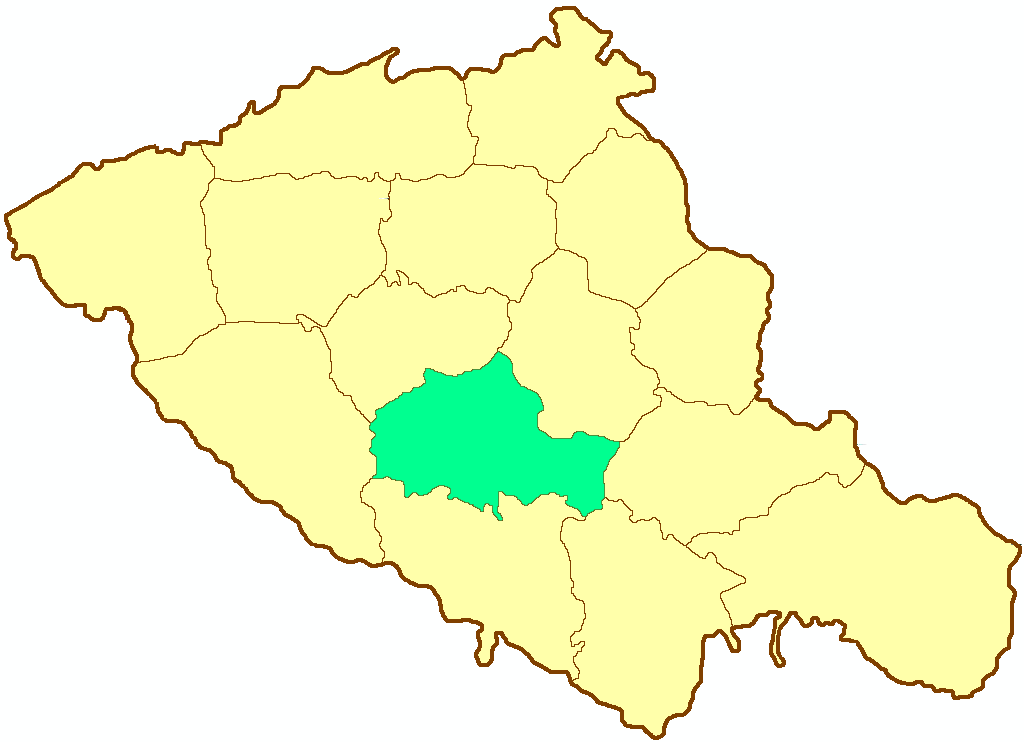
- Location in the Poltava Governorate
- Country: Russian Empire
- Governorate: Poltava
- Established: 1781
- Abolished: 1923
- Capital: Khorol'

Population (1897)
  - Total: 173,375

Khorolsky Uyezd (Хорольский уезд) was one of the subdivisions of the Poltava Governorate of the Russian Empire. It was situated in the central part of the governorate. Its administrative centre was Khorol.

== Demographics ==
At the time of the Russian Empire Census of 1897, Khorolsky Uyezd had a population of 173,375. Of these, 96.6% spoke Ukrainian, 2.3% Yiddish, 0.9% Russian and 0.1% Polish as their native language.
