= Lokhvitsky Uyezd =

Subdivision of Poltava Governorate, Russian Empire

Lokhvitsky Uyezd Лохвица уѣздъ
- Uezd
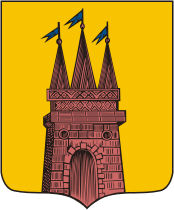
- Coat of arms

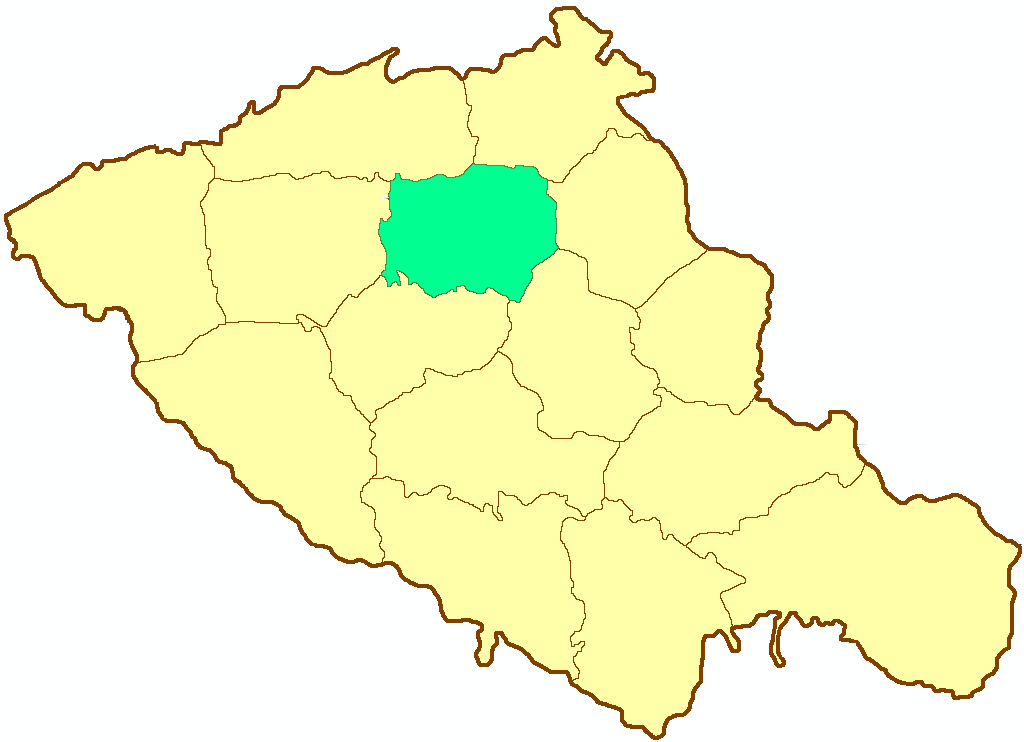
- Location in the Poltava Governorate
- Country: Russian Empire
- Governorate: Poltava
- Established: 1781
- Abolished: 1923
- Capital: Lokhvitsa

Population (1897)
  - Total: 150,985

Lokhvitsky Uyezd (Лохвицкий уезд) was one of the subdivisions of the Poltava Governorate of the Russian Empire. It was situated in the northern part of the governorate. Its administrative centre was Lokhvitsa (Lokhvytsia).

== Demographics ==
At the time of the Russian Empire Census of 1897, Lokhvitsky Uyezd had a population of 150,985. Of these, 95.8% spoke Ukrainian, 3.1% Yiddish, 0.9% Russian and 0.1% Belarusian as their native language.
