= Poltava Governorate =

1802–1925 administrative unit in present day Ukraine

Coordinates: 49.5744°N 34.5686°E

Poltava Governorate Полтавская губерния
- Governorate of the Russian Empire (1802–1917) and Ukrainian successor states (1917–25)
- 1802–1925
- Coat of arms

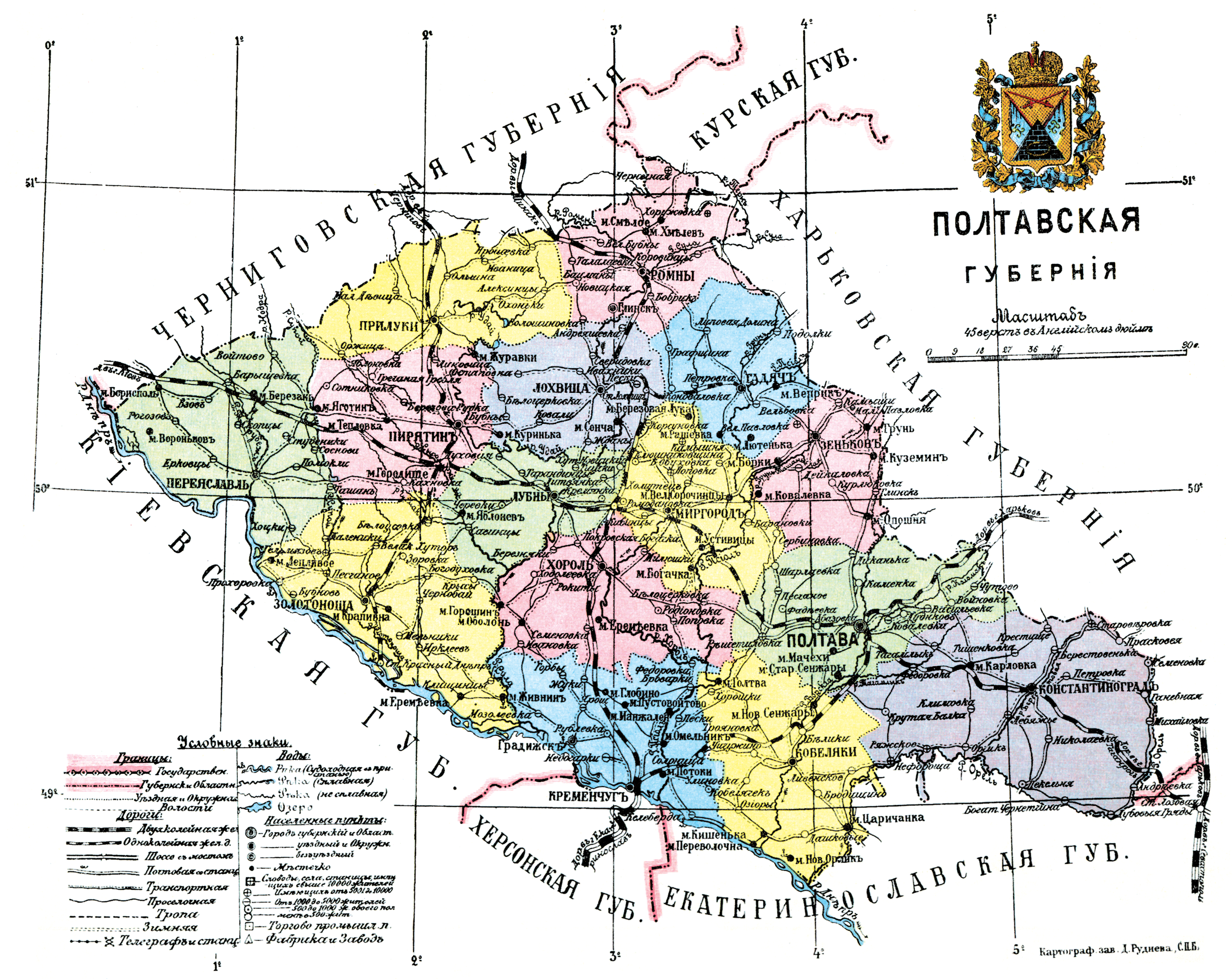
- Poltava Governorate in 1913
- Location in the Russian Empire
- Capital: Poltava
- Area
  - (1897): 49,894 km^{2} (19,264 sq mi)
- Population
  - (1897): 2,778,151
- History
  - Established: 1802
  - Abolished: 1925
- Political subdivisions: 15 uezds (1802–1923); 7 okruhas (1923–25)
Preceded by
Little Russia Governorate (1796–1802)
Kremenchuk Governorate
Succeeded by
Kremenchuk Governorate
Kremenchuk Okruha
Lubensky Okruha
Poltavsky Okruha
Prylutsky Okruha
Romensky Okruha
- Today part of: Poltava Oblast; Kharkiv Oblast; Kyiv Oblast; Sumy Oblast

Poltava Governorate (Note: Russian: Полтавская губерния, pre-1918: Полтавская губернія, romanized: Poltavskaya guberniya; Ukrainian: Полтавська губернія, romanized: Poltavsʼka huberniia) was an administrative-territorial unit (guberniya) of the Russian Empire. It was officially created in 1802 from the disbanded Little Russia Governorate and had its capital in Poltava.

Its borders encompassed the modern Poltava Oblast of Ukraine, in addition to Berestyn, Pereiaslav, Romny and Zolotonosha.

It was bordering the Chernigov and Kursk Governorates to the north, Kiev Governorate to the west, Kharkov Governorate to the east and the Kherson and Yekaterinoslav Governorates to the south.

== History ==
In 1802, the Little Russia Governorate was disbanded and its territory split between the new Chernigov and Poltava Governorates.

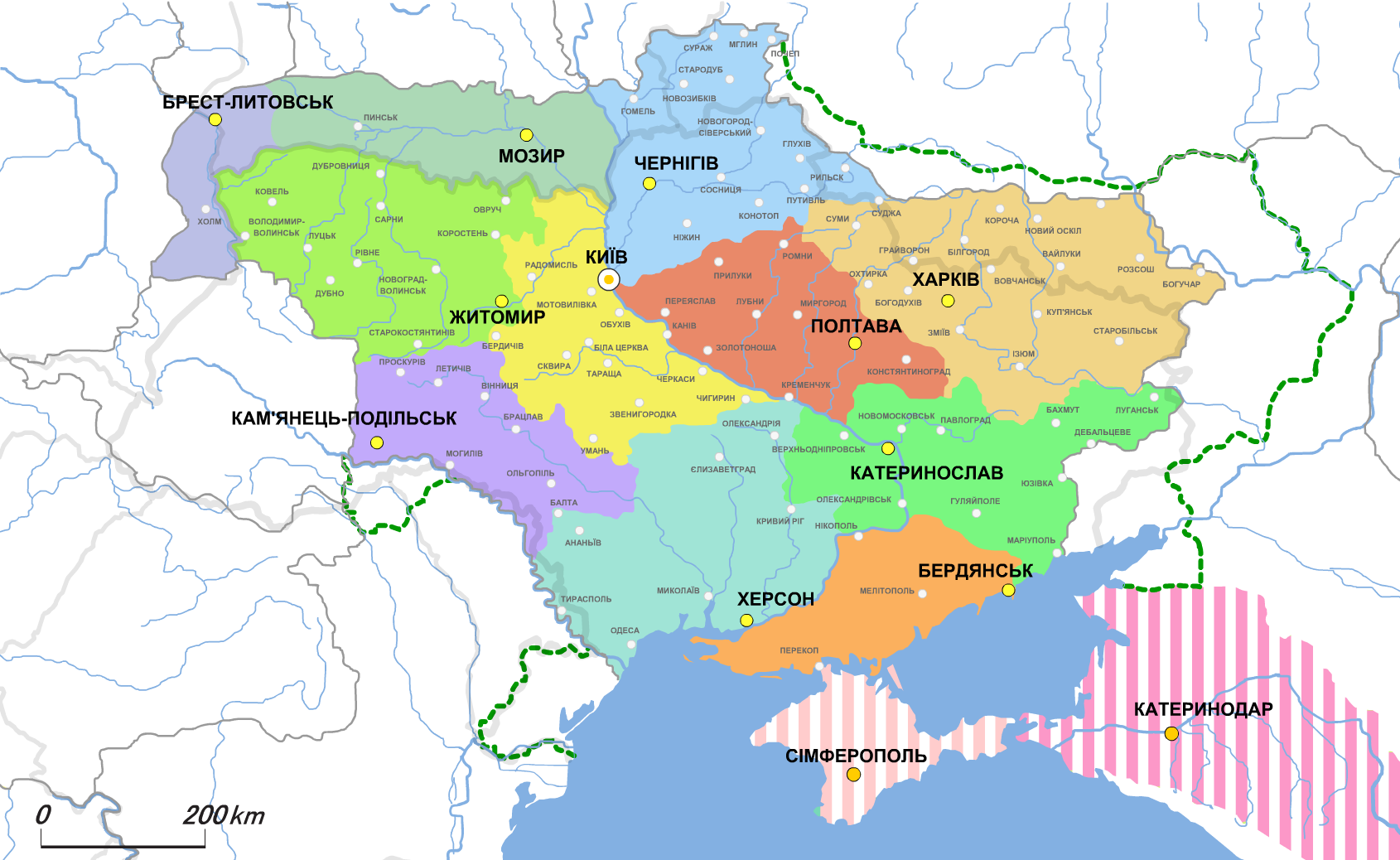
Poltava Governorate (red) in the Ukrainian State

The governorate was part of the Ukrainian People's Republic from 1917 to 1920, interrupted in 1918 by the Ukrainian State.

Under the Russian Provisional Government administrative power in the governorates was transferred to commissars, who preserved their positions after the proclamation of Ukrainian People's Republic in November 1917. Their power was mostly nominal due to the growth of Bolshevik Soviet influence, especially in industrial areas. During that time Andriy Livytskyi served as the gubernial commissar of Poltava.

After the return of Central Rada in March 1918 new commissars were appointed along with military commandants. After the establishment of the Hetmanate, in May 1918 those were replaced with Governorate starosts.

After the formation of the Ukrainian SSR, the territory was wholly included into the new Soviet Republic. Initially the governorate system was retained – although variations included the Kremenchug Governorate which was temporarily formed on its territory (August 1920 – December 1922), and the passing of the Pereyaslavsky Uyezd to the Kiev Governorate. However, on June 3, 1925, the governorate was liquidated and succeeded by five okruhas (which already were its subdivisions as of March 7, 1923): Kremenchutsky, Lubensky, Poltavsky, Prylutsky and Romensky (the remaining two okrugs existed within the governate, Zolotonoshsky and Krasnohradsky, were also liquidated).

== Demographics ==
The governorate had a population of 2,778,151 according to the 1897 Russian Empire census. Most people (90.13%) lived on the countryside, while a tenth (9.87%) lived in towns and cities. In 1914, the population had increased to 2,794,727.

=== Largest towns and cities ===
According to the 1897 census, nine settlements had more than 10,000 people.

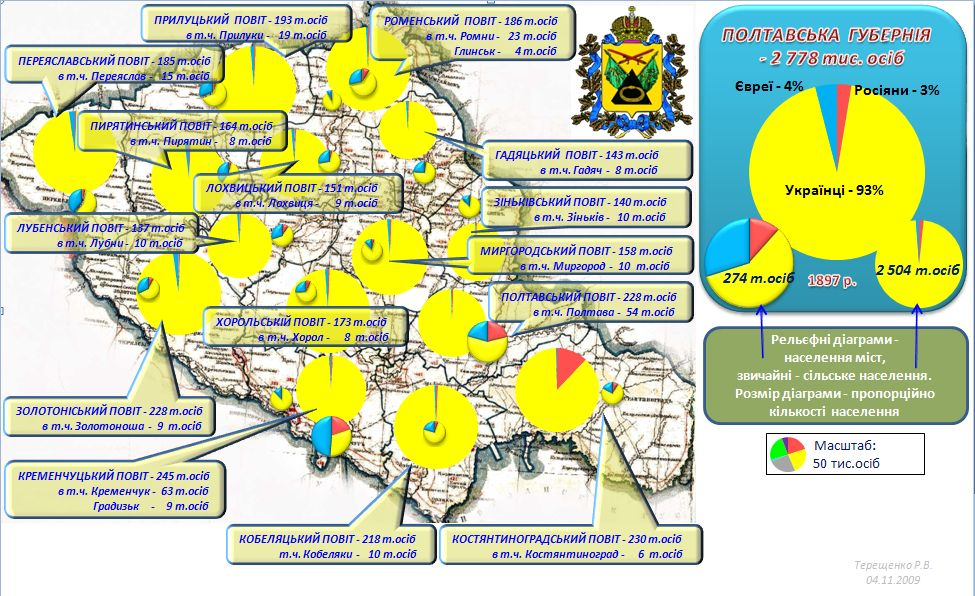
Russian census of 1897 – Great Russians, – Little Russians

- **Kremenchug** – 63,007 (Jewish – 29,577, Ukrainian – 18,980, Russian – 12,130)
- **Poltava** – 53,703 (Ukrainian – 30,086, Russian – 11,035, Jewish – 10,690)
- Romny – 22,510 (Ukrainian – 13,856, Jewish – 6,341, Russian – 1,933)
- Priluki – 18,532 (Ukrainian – 11,850, Jewish – 5,719, Russian – 821)
- Pereyaslav – 14,614 (Ukrainian – 8,348, Jewish – 5,737, Russian – 468)
- Kobeliaki – 10,487 (Ukrainian – 7,708, Jewish – 2,115, Russian – 564)
- Zenkov – 10,443 (Ukrainian – 8,957, Jewish – 1,261, Russian – 187)
- Lubny – 10,097 (Ukrainian – 5,975, Jewish – 3,001, Russian – 960)
- Mirgorod – 10,037 (Ukrainian – 8,290, Jewish – 1,248, Russian – 427)

In bold are cities with a population of over 50,000.

=== Native Languages ===
By the 1897 census, Ukrainian was by far the most native spoken language in the governorate, followed by Yiddish and Russian.

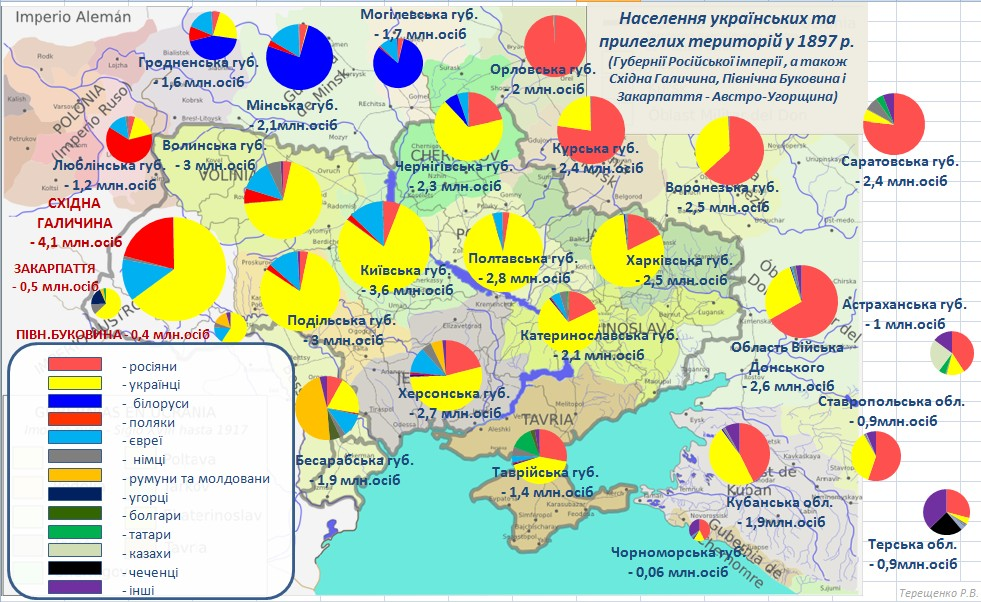
Comparison with other governorates (1897) – Great Russians, – Little Russians

Language	Number	percentage (%)	males	females
**Ukrainian**	2,583,133	92.98	1,276,578	1,306,555
**Yiddish**	110,352	3.97	53,860	56,492
Russian	72,941	2.63	38,851	34,090
German	4,579	0.16	2,257	2,322
Polish	3,891	0.14	2,782	1,109
Belarusian	1,344	0.05	823	521
Persons that did not identify their native language	92	<0.01	65	27
Other (Note: Languages, number of speakers which in all gubernia were less than 1000)	1,819	0.07	1,323	496

In bold are native languages spoken by more people than the state language.

=== Religion ===
By the 1897 census, the majority religion in the governorate and virtually the state religion was Eastern Orthodox Christianity with some of the population following Judaism. Other religions were much less common.

Religion	Number	percentage (%)	males	females
Eastern Orthodoxy	2,654,645	95.55	1,314,851	1,339,794
Judaism	110,944	3.99	54,073	56,871
Other (Note: Religions, number of believers which in all gubernia were less than 10000) (Roman Catholicism, Lutheranism, Old Believers)	12,562	0.45	7,615	4,947

== Administrative divisions ==
The governorate was divided into 15 uezds (povits in Ukrainian):

Uezd	Administrative seat		Area	Population (1897 census)
Transliteration (Cyrillic)	Coat of arms	Transliteration (Cyrillic)	Area	Population (1897 census)
Gadyachsky (Гадячский)		Gadyach (Гадячъ)	2,460.9 km^{2} (950.2 mi^{2})	142,806
Zenkovsky (Зеньковский)		Zenkov (Зеньковъ)	2,250.5 km^{2} (868.9 mi^{2})	140,304
Zolotonoshsky (Золотоношский)		Zolotonosha (Золотоноша)	4,425.5 km^{2} (1,708.7 mi^{2})	227,594
Kobelyaksky (Кобелякский)		Kobeliaki (Кобеляки)	3,672.8 km^{2} (1,418.1 mi^{2})	217,875
Konstantinogradsky (Константиноградский)		Konstantinograd (Константиноградъ)	6,079.2 km^{2} (2,347.2 mi^{2})	230,310
Kremenchugsky (Кременчугский)		Kremenchug (Кременчугъ)	3,429.2 km^{2} (1,324.0 mi^{2})	244,894
Lokhvitsky (Лохвицкий)		Lokhvitsa (Лохвица)	2,640.9 km^{2} (1,019.6 mi^{2})	150,985
Lubensky (Лубенский)		Lubny (Лубны)	2,344.0 km^{2} (905.0 mi^{2})	136,613
Mirgorodsky (Миргородский)		Mirgorod (Миргородъ)	2,659.3 km^{2} (1,026.8 mi^{2})	157,790
Pereyaslavsky (Переяславский)		Pereyaslav (Переяславъ)	4,091.6 km^{2} (1,579.8 mi^{2})	185,306
Piryatinsky (Пирятинский)		Piryatin (Пирятинъ)	3,268.1 km^{2} (1,261.8 mi^{2})	163,505
Poltavsky (Полтавский)		Poltava (Полтава)	3,389.0 km^{2} (1,308.5 mi^{2})	227,795
Priluksky (Прилукский)		Priluki (Прилуки)	3,274.7 km^{2} (1,264.4 mi^{2})	192,502
Romensky (Роменский)		Romny (Ромны)	2,600.7 km^{2} (1,004.1 mi^{2})	186,497
Khorolsky (Хорольский)		Khorol (Хороль)	3,311.0 km^{2} (1,278.4 mi^{2})	173,375
