= Poltava Governorate Zemstvo Building =

- Будинок Полтавського губернського земства
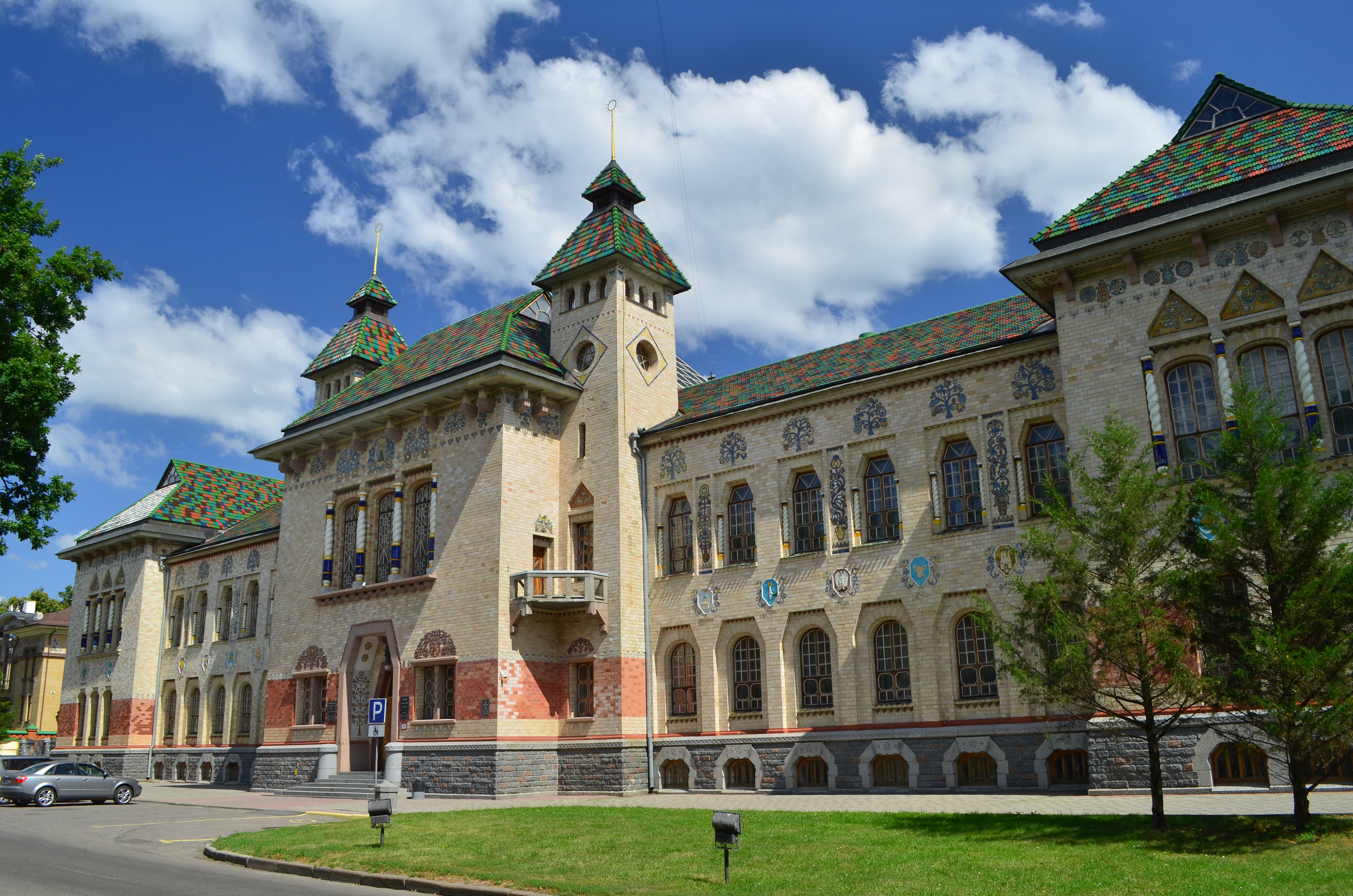
- Interactive map of the Poltava Governorate Zemstvo Building area

General information
- Architectural style: Ukrainian Art Nouveau
- Location: Constitution Square, 2, Poltava, Ukraine
- Coordinates: 49°35′01″N 34°33′41″E
- Year built: 1903–1908

Design and construction
- Architect: Vasyl Krychevsky

Immovable Monument of National Significance of Ukraine
- Official name: Будинок земства (Zemstvo Building)
- Type: Architecture
- Reference no.: 160034

Poltava Governorate Zemstvo Building is a former administrative building and an architectural monument in Poltava, Ukraine. It was built in 1903–1908 according to the design of the architect Vasyl Krychevsky, using original designs by Y. Shirshov and M. Nikolaev. The building was used by the zemstvo (regional government) of the Poltava Governorate under the Russian Empire. It is the first example of Ukrainian Art Nouveau architecture. Nowadays, the Poltava Museum of Local Lore is stationed in the building.

== History ==
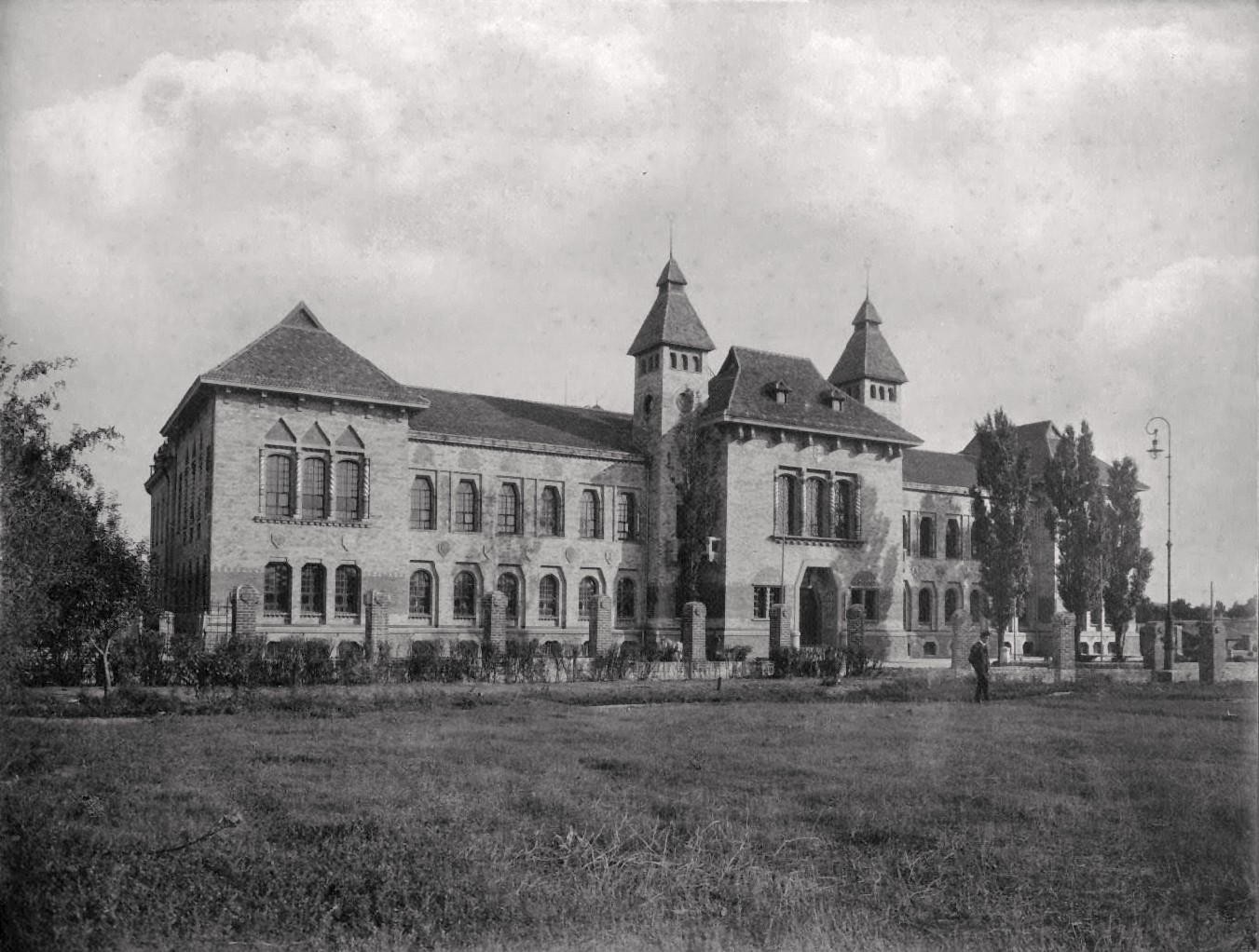
Façade of the building in early 20th century

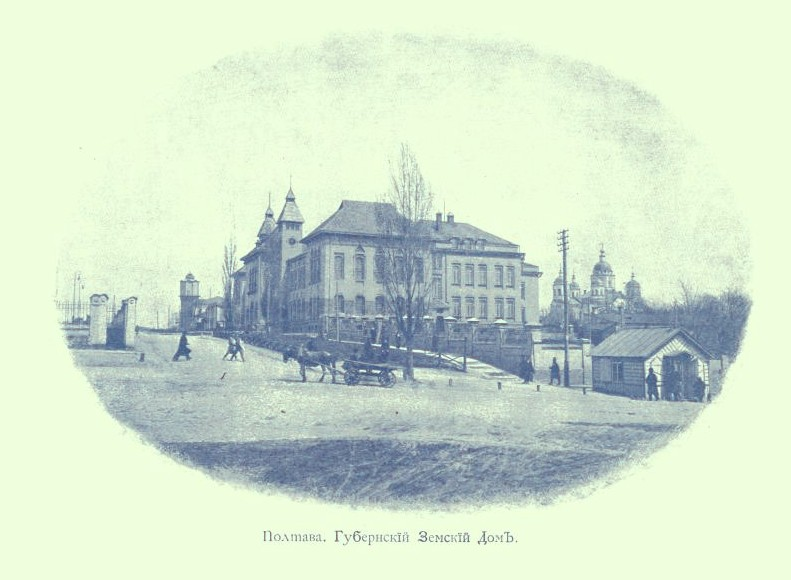
Side view of the building in early 20th century

As the result of the meetings on development of folk crafts in Poltava region, held in 1902 and early 1903, which were attended by the artists and architects Serhii Vasylkivsky, Opanas Slastion, Vasyl Krychevsky and others, the idea of a new Ukrainian folk style in art and architecture had emerged. In particular, Serhii Vasylkivsky criticized the design of the zemstvo building, which was originally made by Y. Shirhov. After the architect's refusal to edit the design as demanded by the zemstvo, it was remade by V. Nikolaev. He proposed to reject the original idea of a building in the style of Renaissance Revival or Neoclassicism, which were typical of government buildings at the time, and instead approve a design that reflects local folk elements. The idea was supported by the writer Mykola Dmitriyev, who put forward the name Ukrainian style to describe the style. In the presses of Poltava and later Kiev, Opanas Slastion argued for the necessity of the development of such an architectural style.

As the result, two design competitions were held for the building: the first on June 6, and the second on June 23 of 1903. A special commission of the government headed by Fedir Lyzohub considered 8 projects, authors of which were Y. Shirhov, V. Nikolaev (two), I. Zholtovsky (two), Vidensky, P. Volkov, and Vasyl Krychevsky, and made ultimately approved the last design. Since the foundations of the building were already laid in the spring of 1903, Krychevsky had to redesign the project that was already under construction. Folk art from Opishnia was a major inspiration for Krychevsky.

The building functioned as an administrative and museum building until 1920, when it became the Central Proletariat Museum of Poltava Oblast under the Soviet Union. In the Eastern Front of World War II, the building was burnt down by the Nazis during their retreat in 1943. It underwent reconstruction in 1950s according to the project by P. Kostyrko, V. Kramcher, N. Kvitka and others. As the result, it generally preserved its forms, but experienced changes in parts of the roof and the paintings of the main hall. Nowadays, the building houses the Poltava Museum of Local Lore.

The building is under reconstruction since 2021.

== Architecture ==
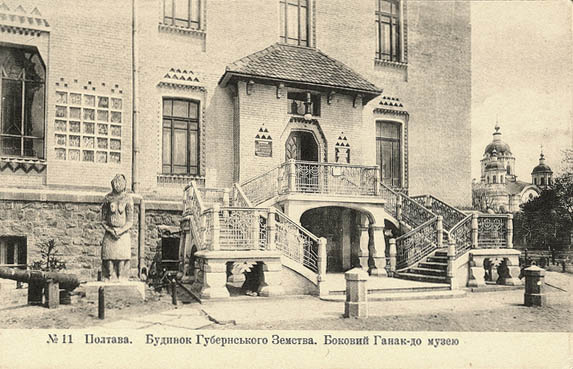
Side porch in early 20th century

The building had a symmetrical Ш-shaped plan. The central part includes a vestibule, the central hall with a grand staircase, and a large meeting room. The other parts have wide corridors that unite the former business premises of the zemstvo administration located on two floors. On the third floor, on the courtyard side, there were museum premises, and in one of the wings there were hotel rooms. he basement floor was reserved for utility and archive premises. From the main façade, the building had two and a half floors, from the courtyard—three and a half.

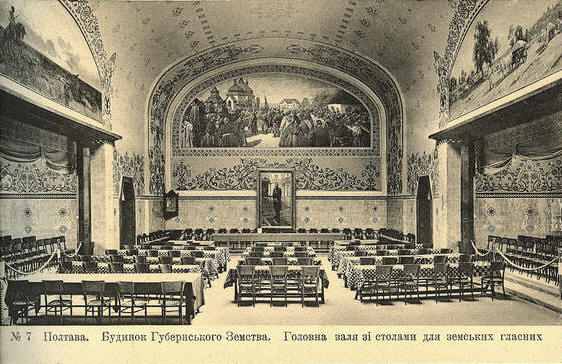
Main hall with tables in early 20th century

The overall composition of the house was extremely expressive. It was defined by three parts protruding forward and two tall towers flanking the central ledge. A high socle of pink granite, composed of large roughly hewn stones, is pierced by windows with figured lintels, and a strong cornice extends above them. The main wall, faced with light yellow ceramics, is pierced on the first floor by slender windows with a semicircular lintel, inscribed in trapezoidal niches. On the second floor, the windows are given a trapezoidal shape, and their lintels rest on twisted columns. The main entrance is recessed into a trapezoidal loggia, and the doorway has the same shape. The carved entrance door has an ornament on the motif of the tree of life. On either side of the main entrance, there are paired windows with a faceted carved column, above which a "flowerpot" has spread its ornamental branches in a semicircle on the wall. Above the main portal there are triple windows with twisted blue-and-white columns, above which the coat of arms of cities of the Poltava Governorate surrounded by flags are depicted. The cornice slab of a large extension was supported by brackets in the form of "grasshoppers", and below them a frieze stretched along the wall, composed of rosettes of various shapes and elegant colors, alternating with stylized vases.

Ornamental decorations are widely used. For example, on the second floor they are arranged like arabesques in the form of "flowerpots." Above the trapezoidal windows, there are painted ornamental inserts on the theme of the tree of life. The house is crowned by a high roof of greenish-blue, glazed tiles, laid out in a direct mosaic set so that the roof changes with the colors of the sky and the reflections of the sun. The general color scheme of the facade is a combination of a pink base with light yellow and golden-ocher ceramics of the wall, girded at the level of the windows of the first floor with a wide orange stripe, polychrome ornamental compositions, white-blue twisted columns, and finally the blue-green roof.

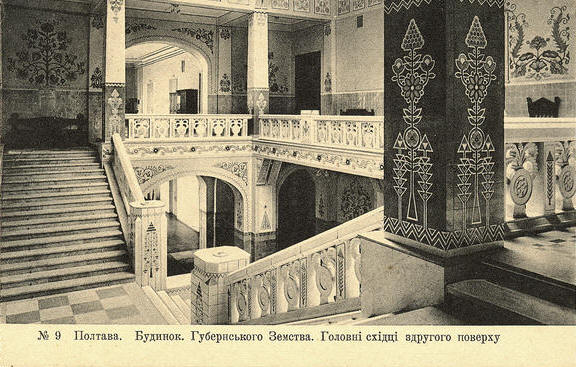
The main staircases as seen from the second floor in early 20th century

This architectural structure was emphasized by two tall and slender towers covered with tent roofs with folds. The interior space in its main parts was connected through wide arched openings and flowed from the lobby to the central hall with its wide marble staircase, turned in two directions, and flooded with rays of light through the glass ceiling. The hall was surrounded by blue-white columns, interwoven with stylized ornaments of the "flowerpot" type and a light balustrade in the form of kumanets, from which a heavy ear of wheat emerged, leaning in two directions. The walls at the level of the stairs were covered with a white faience slab with blue-green flowers on it, which gave the impression of a festive banner. The walls under the columns and on the frieze above the reinforced concrete beams were also decorated with ornaments.

The main hall was marked by a clearly defined cruciform space, covered with an elliptical vault. The walls of the hall were covered with floral ornaments, made according to sketches by Mykola Samokysh, and three large thematic paintings, painted by Serhii Vasylkivsky with the help of Mykola Uvarov and Mykhaylo Berkos. The following paintings were present in the hall: on the main axis of the hall – "Elections of Poltava Colonel M. Pushkar", on the left on the longitudinal wall – "Cossack Holota and the Tatar", on the right – "Romodan Path". The first painting glorified democratic forms of choosing leaders, the second revealed the theme of military victory in the defense of the Poltava region, the third showed trade relations and entrepreneurship.

== Gallery ==
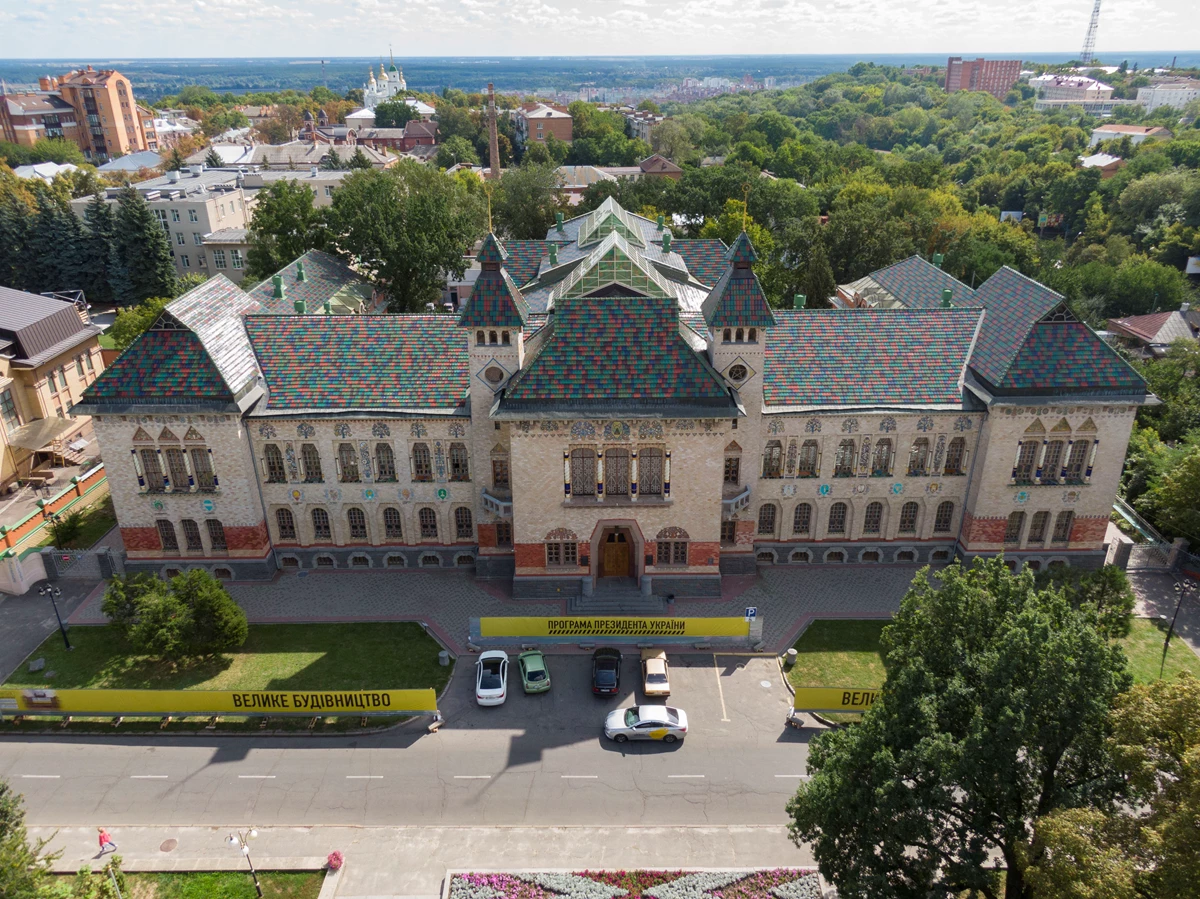
Aerial view

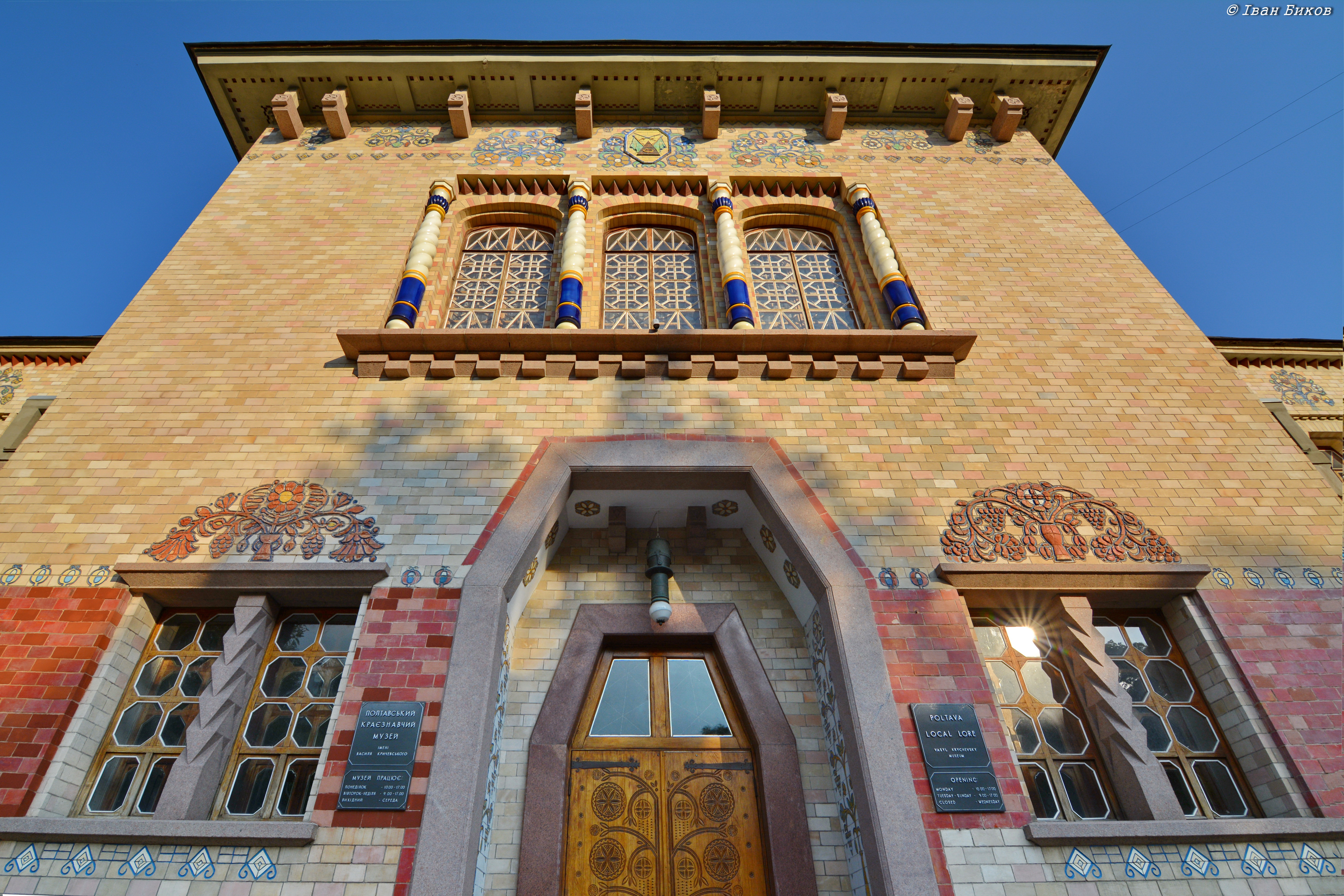
Entrance

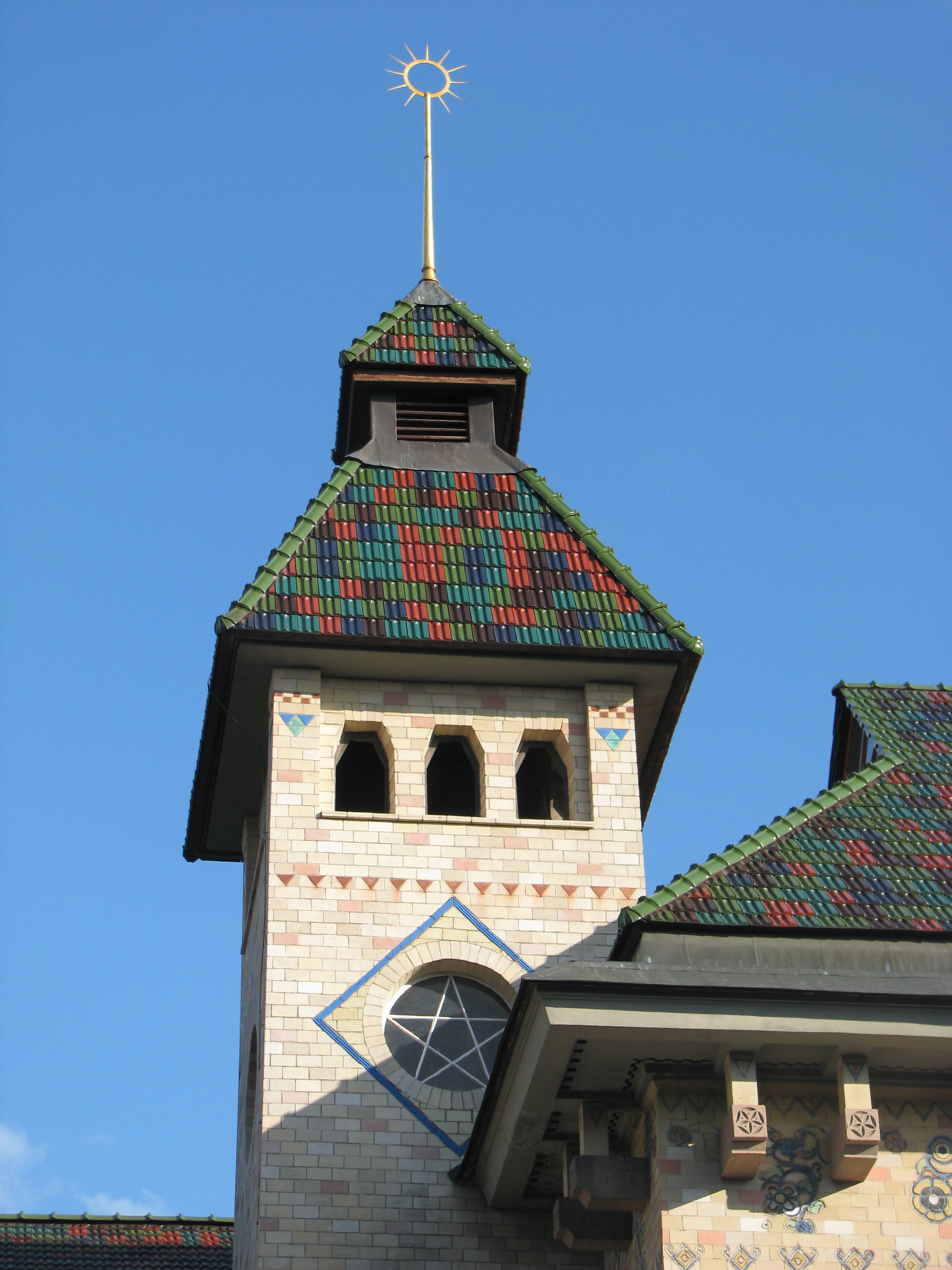
Tower

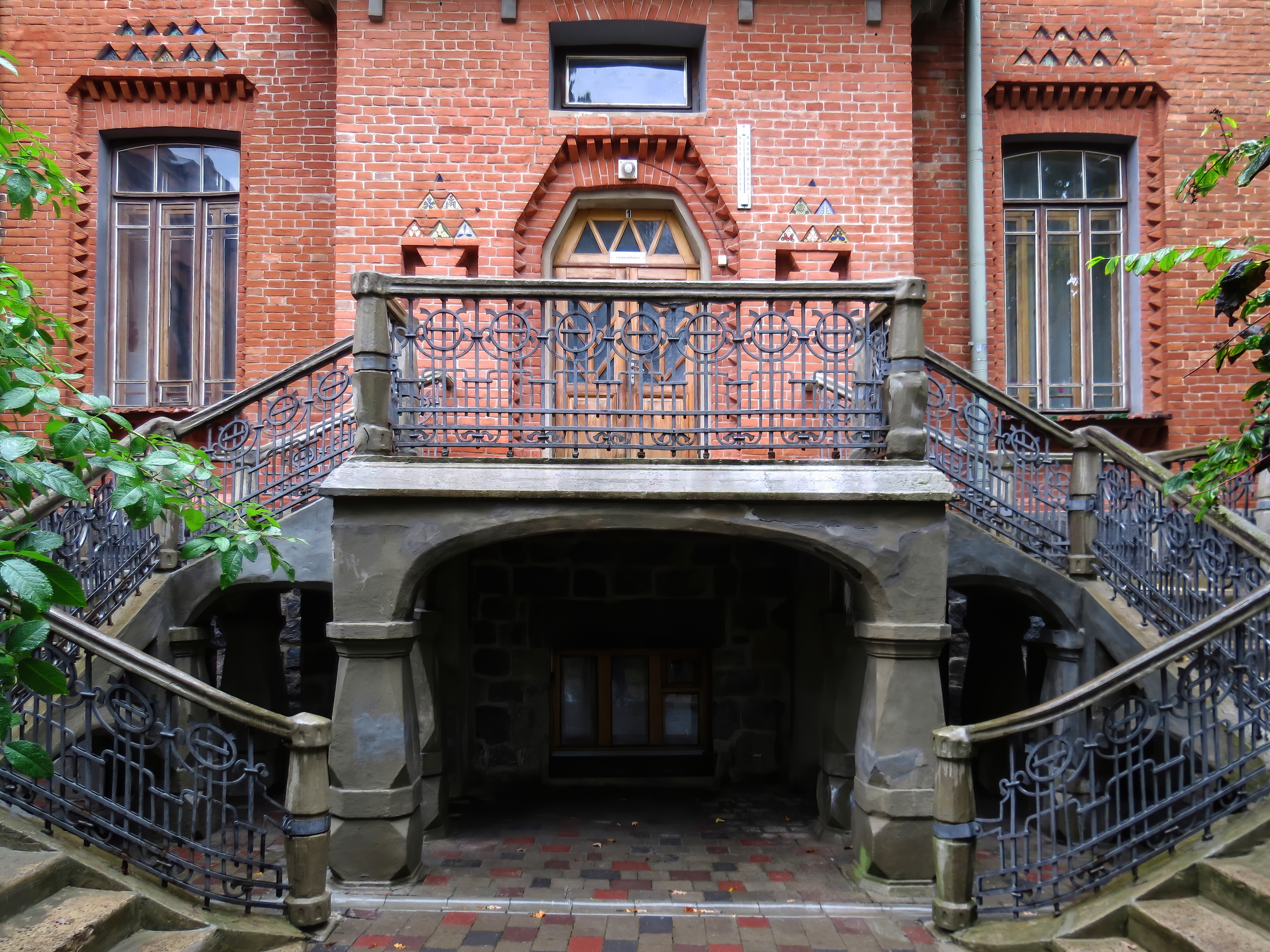
Back entrance

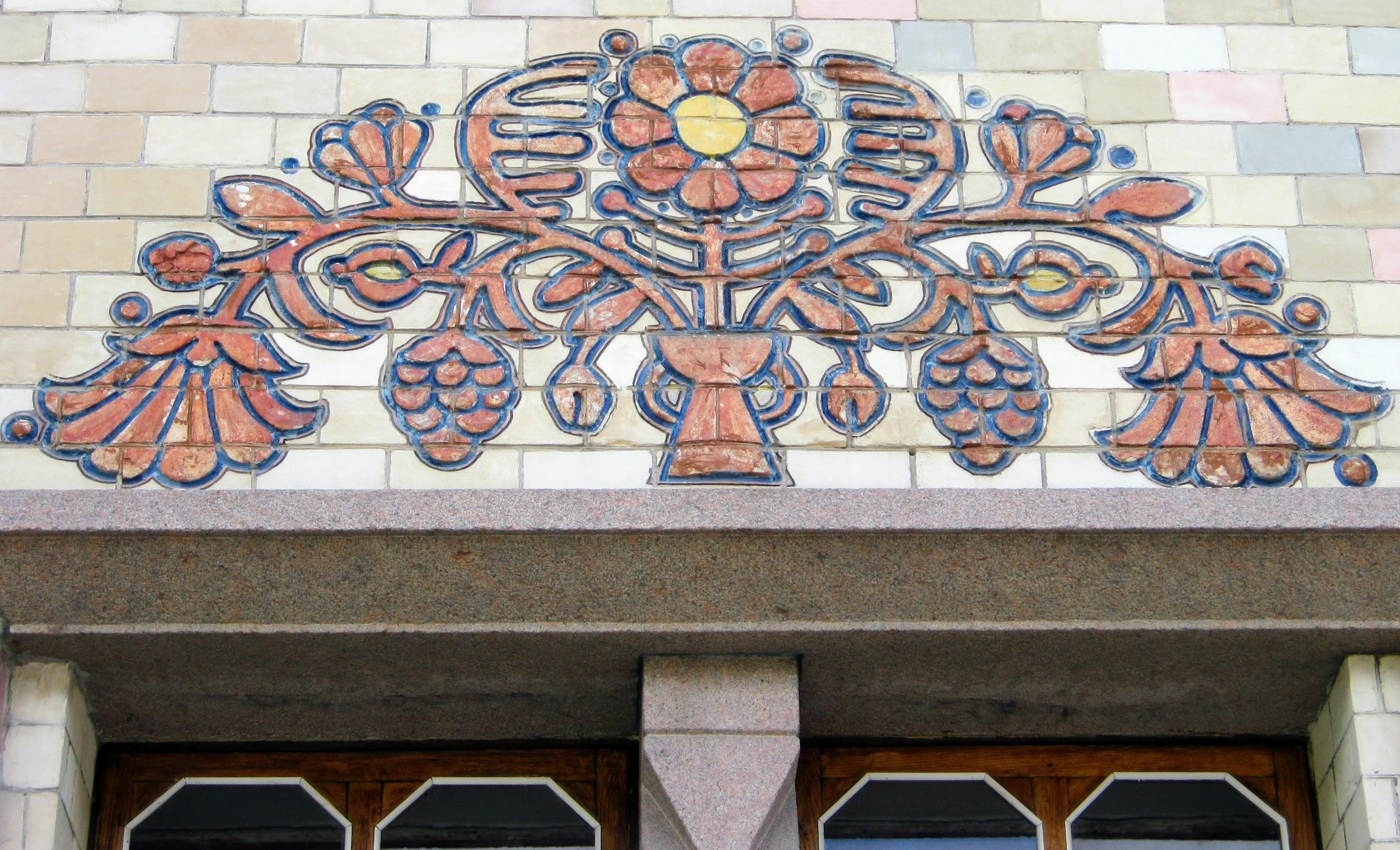
Ornament above windows

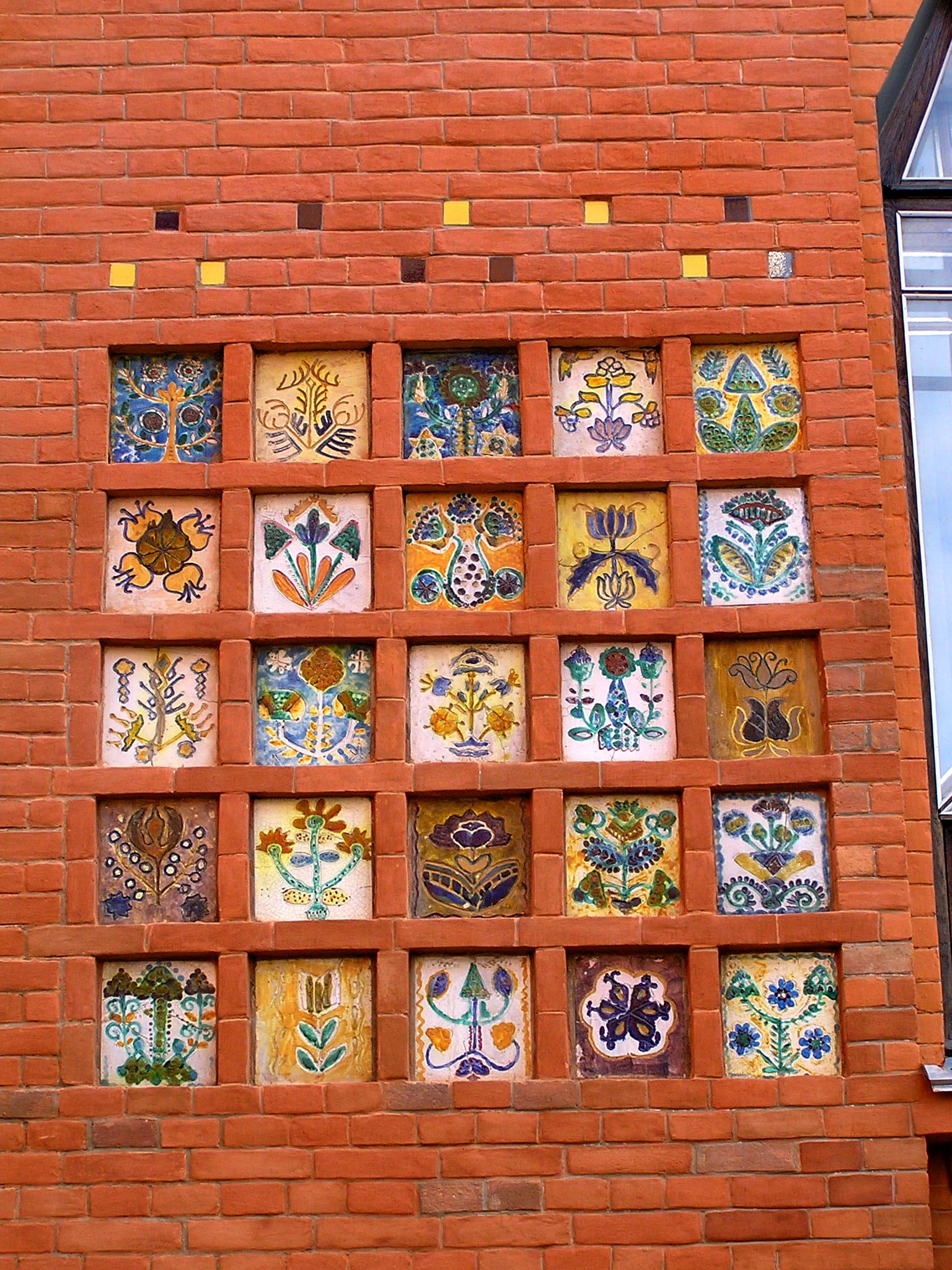
Ornaments on the wall

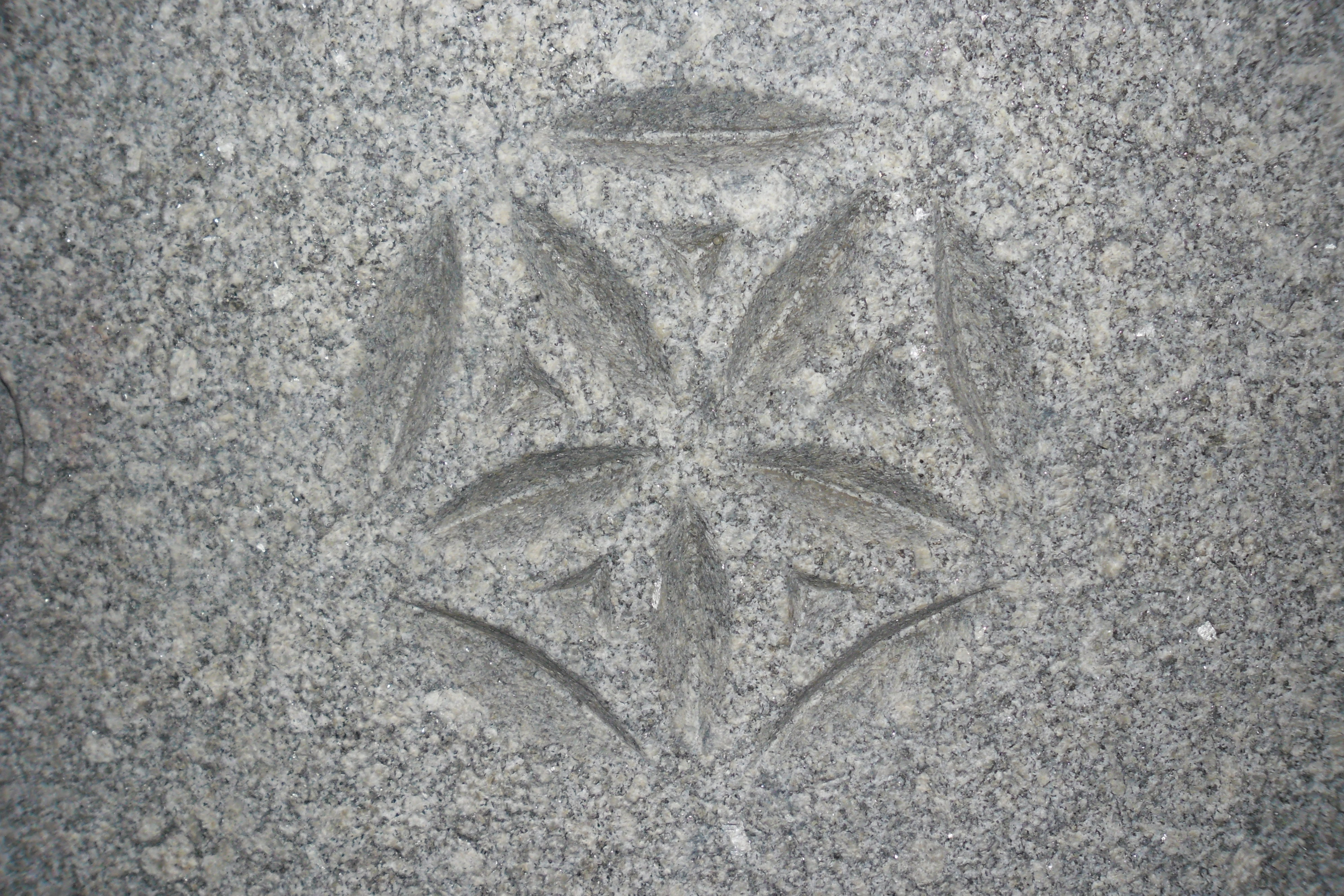
Masonic symbol

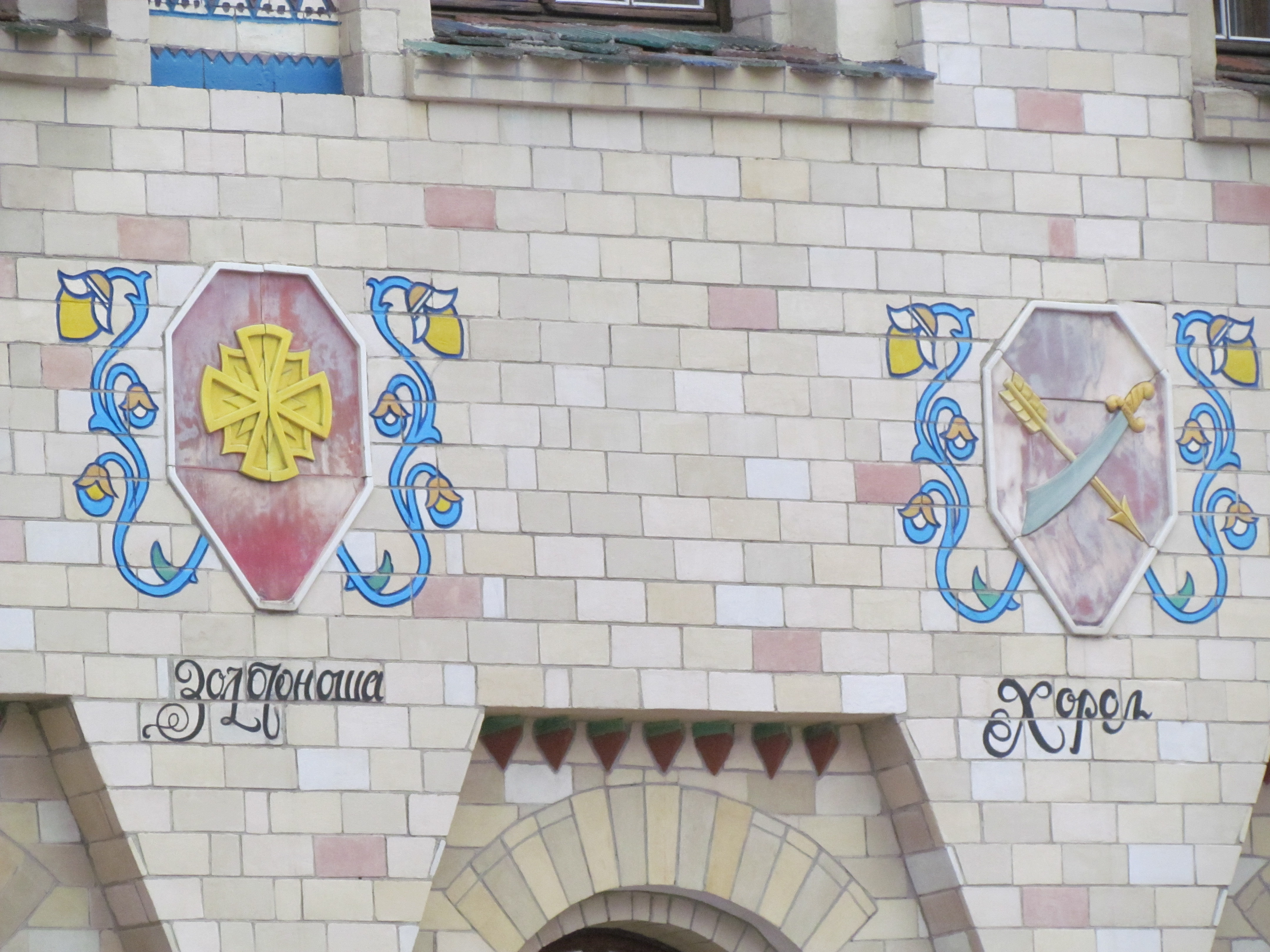
Coats of arms of Zolotonosha and Khorol

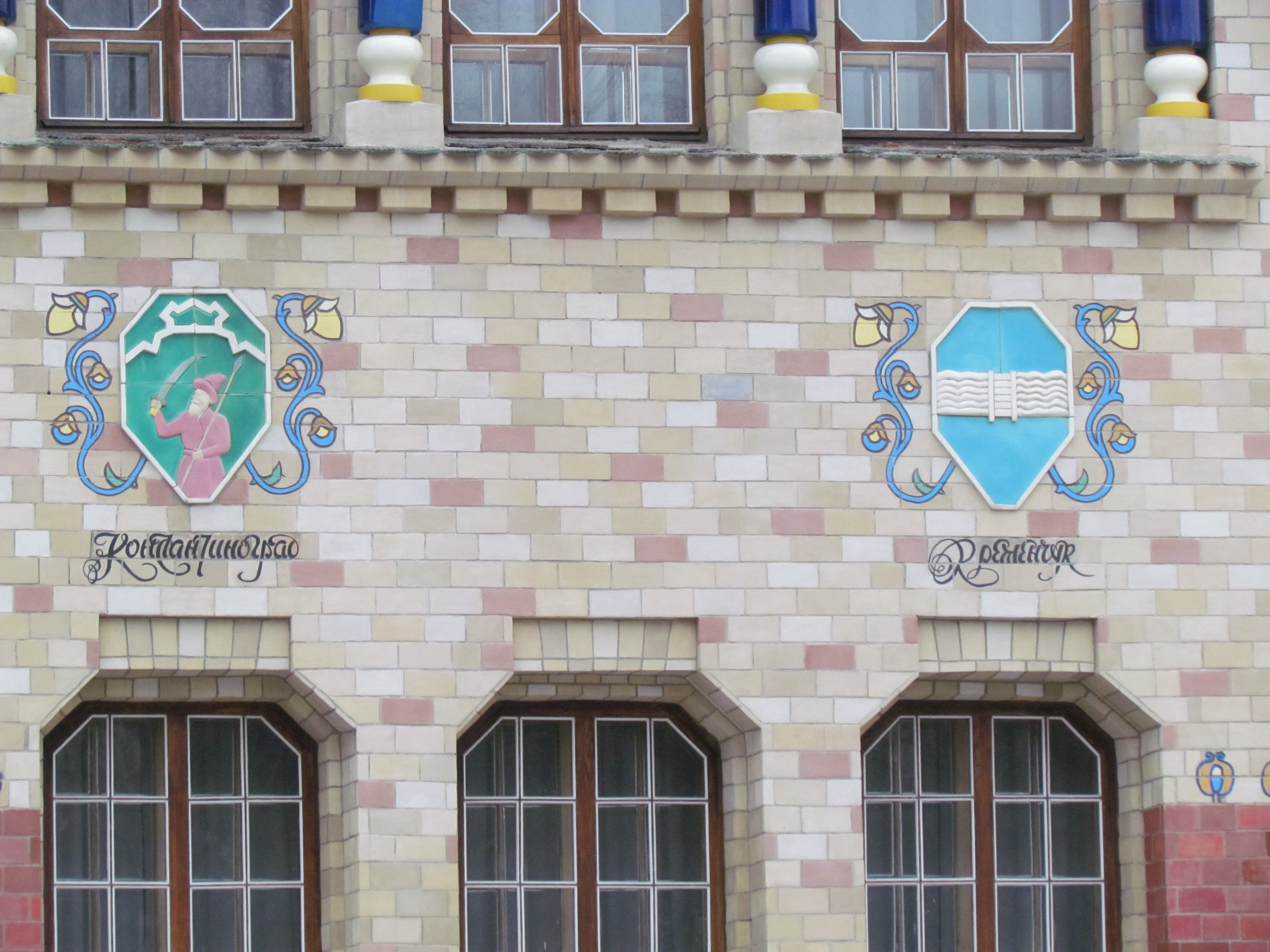
Coats of arms of Kostiantynohrad and Kremenchuk

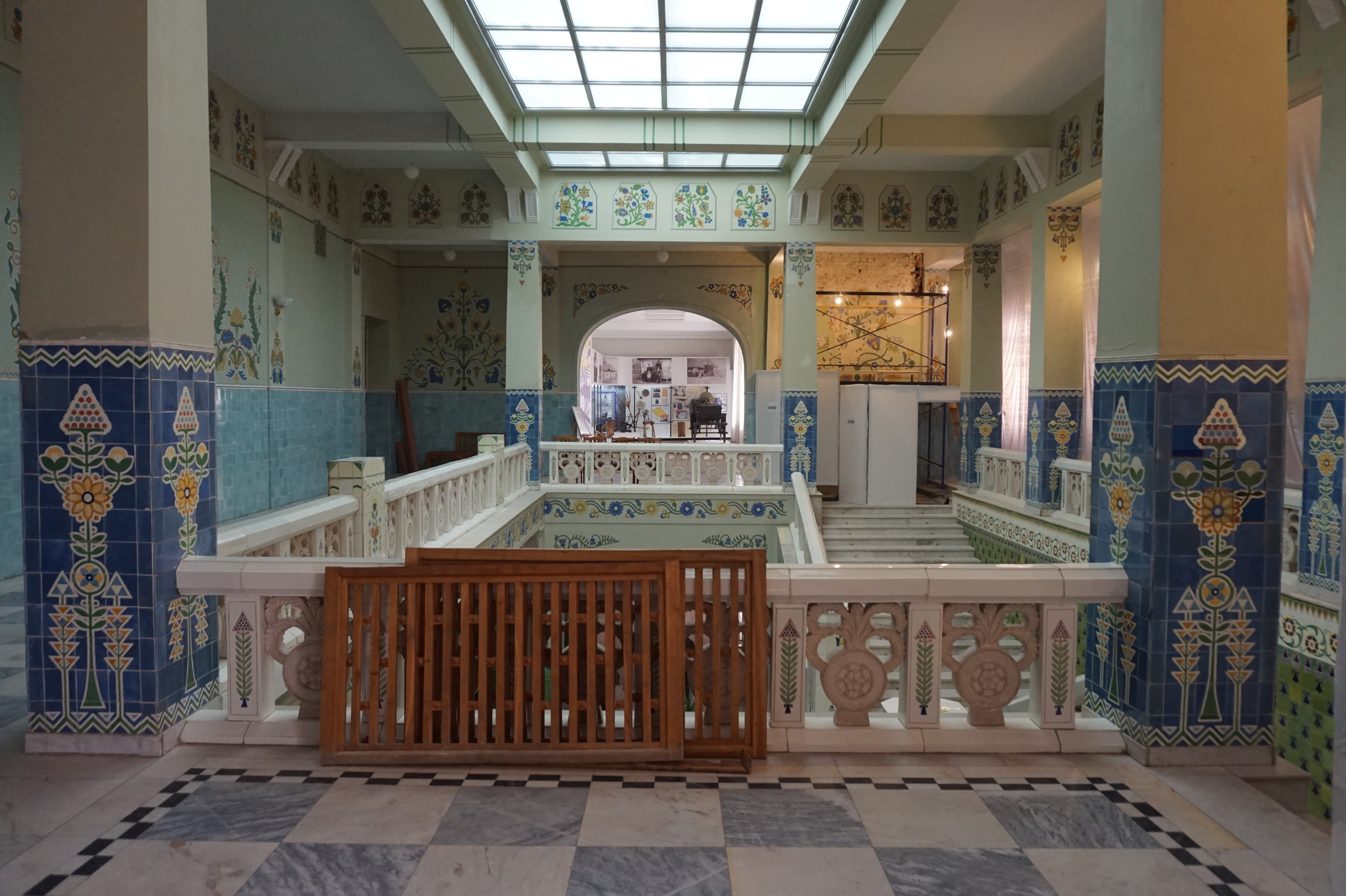
View of the staircases from the second floor

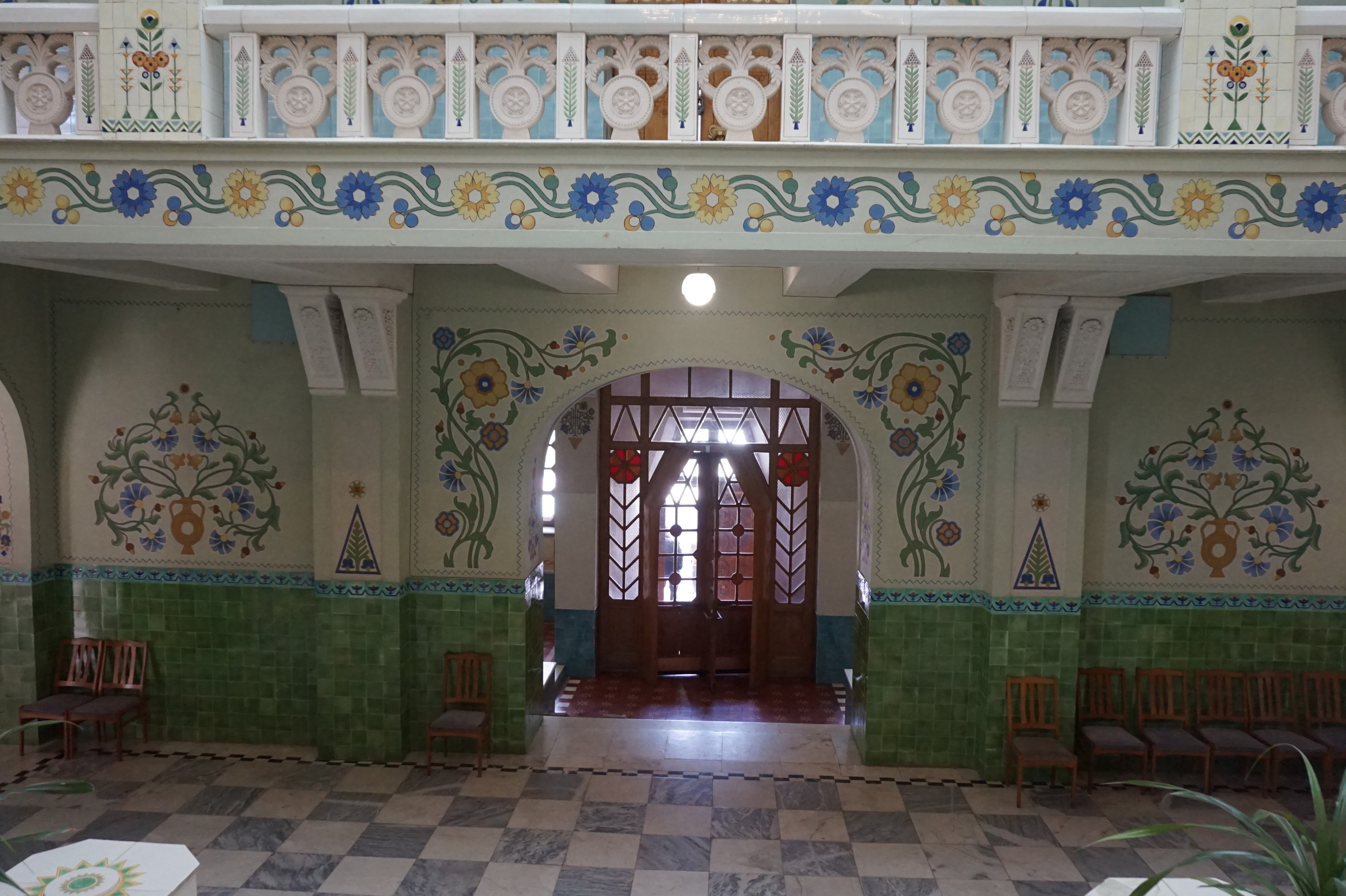
Front door from the inside

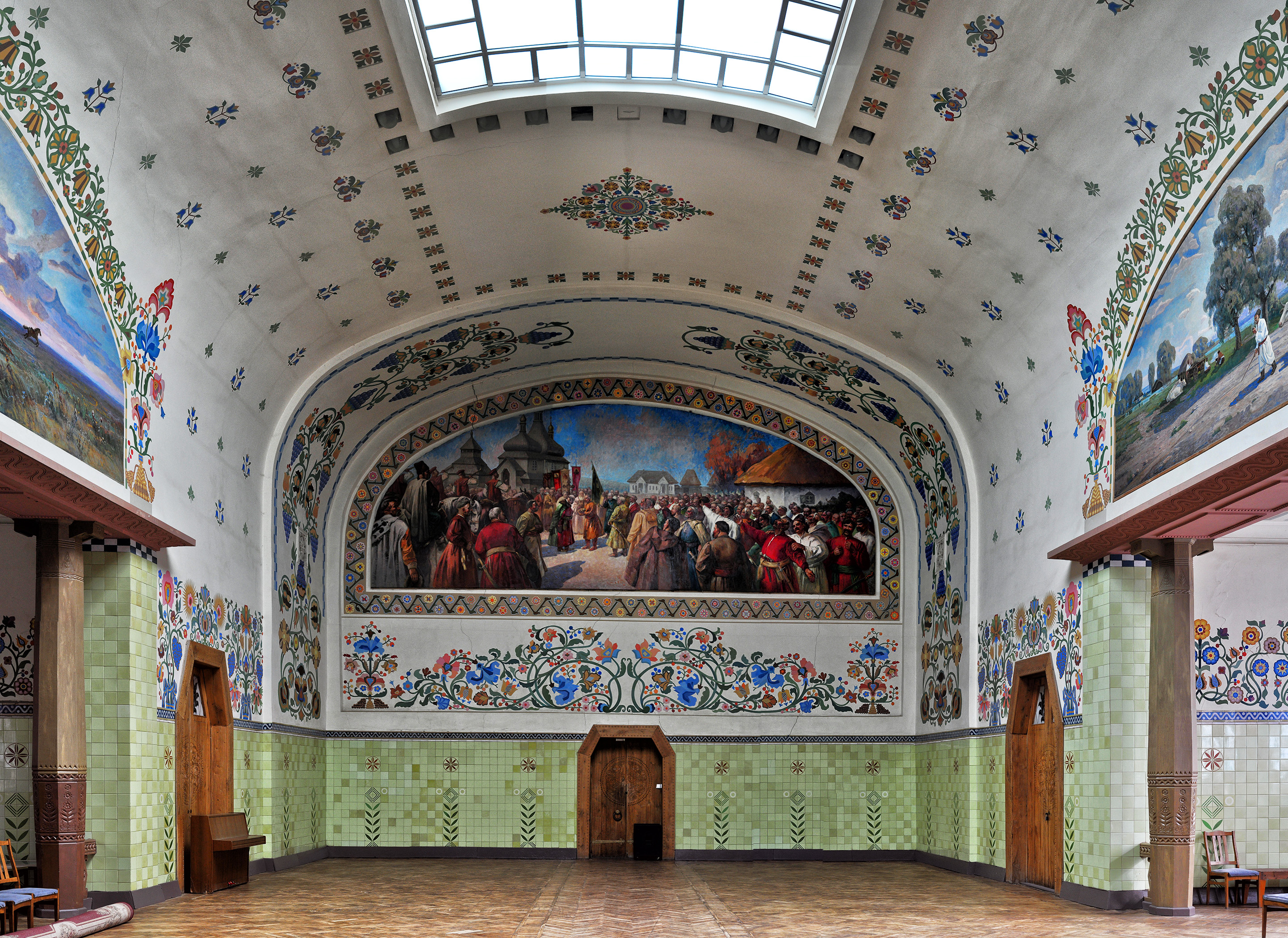
Main hall
