= Opishnia decorative ceramics =

Traditional ceramics from Poltava Oblast

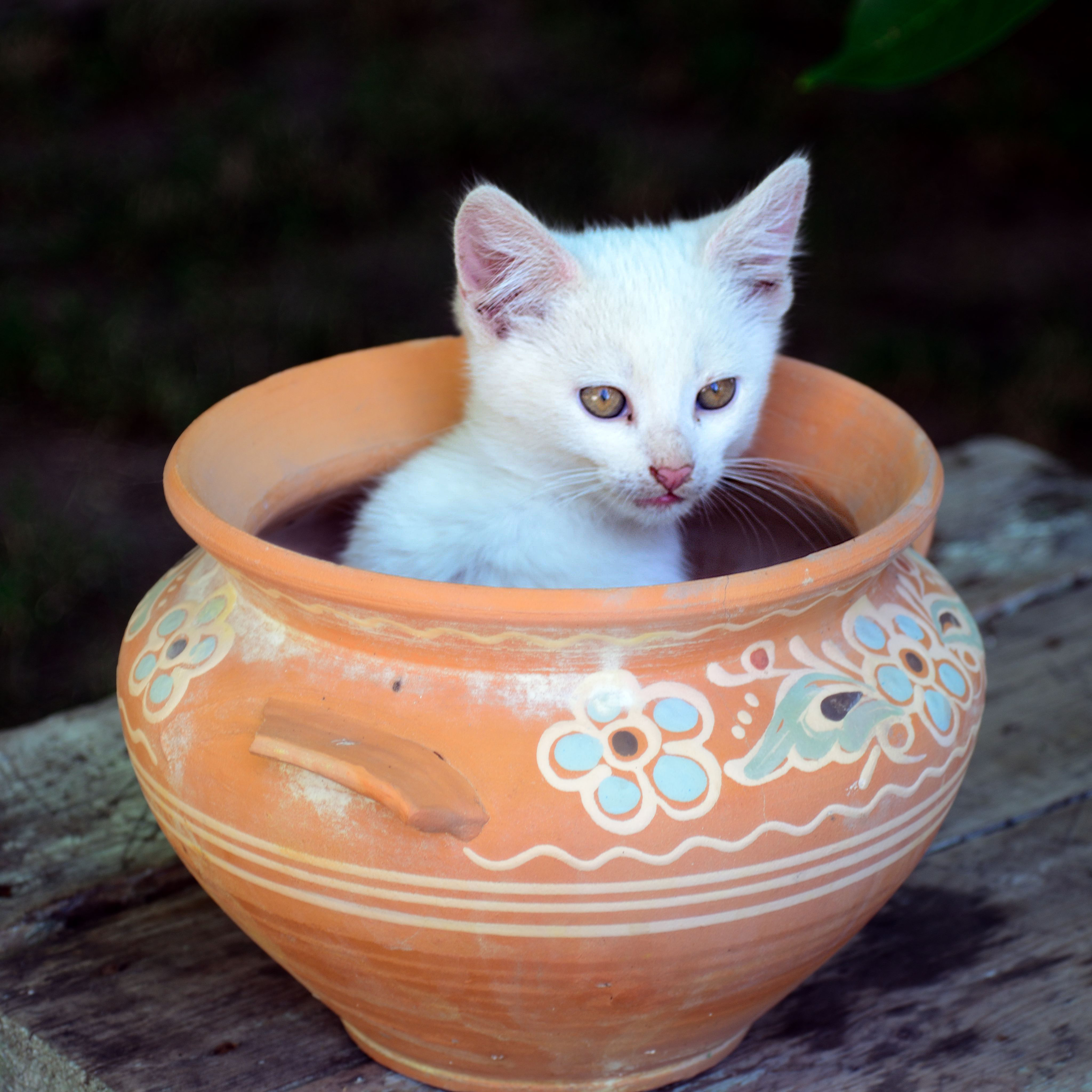
Kitten in a makitra with Opishnia decoration

Opishnia decorative ceramics (Ukrainian: Опішнянська кераміка) are a type of traditional Ukrainian ceramics from the village of Opishnia in Poltava Oblast, which is one of the largest centers of pottery production in Ukraine. The distinctive decoration emerged during the second half of the nineteenth century, and the region consolidated its reputation for pottery production. Opishnia painting is mostly of plant ornaments: flowers, bunches of grapes, bouquets and wreaths. Characteristic features are the light yellow of the pattern on a red-brown, white or green background.

During the twentieth century, there were further developments in style inspired by Soviet political ideology. Political repression in the 1930s and 1950s affected the pottery industry, with potters and other people associated with the industry being sentenced to death or imprisonment. The industry consolidated in the 1960s, and in 1986, the Pottery Museum was founded in the village. In 2001, the museum became the National Museum-Reserve of Ukrainian Pottery concerned with the study, preservation and popularization of Ukraine's pottery heritage. Famous ceramicists include Olga Shiyan, Oleksandra Selyuchenko and Yavdokha Poshyvaylo.

== History ==
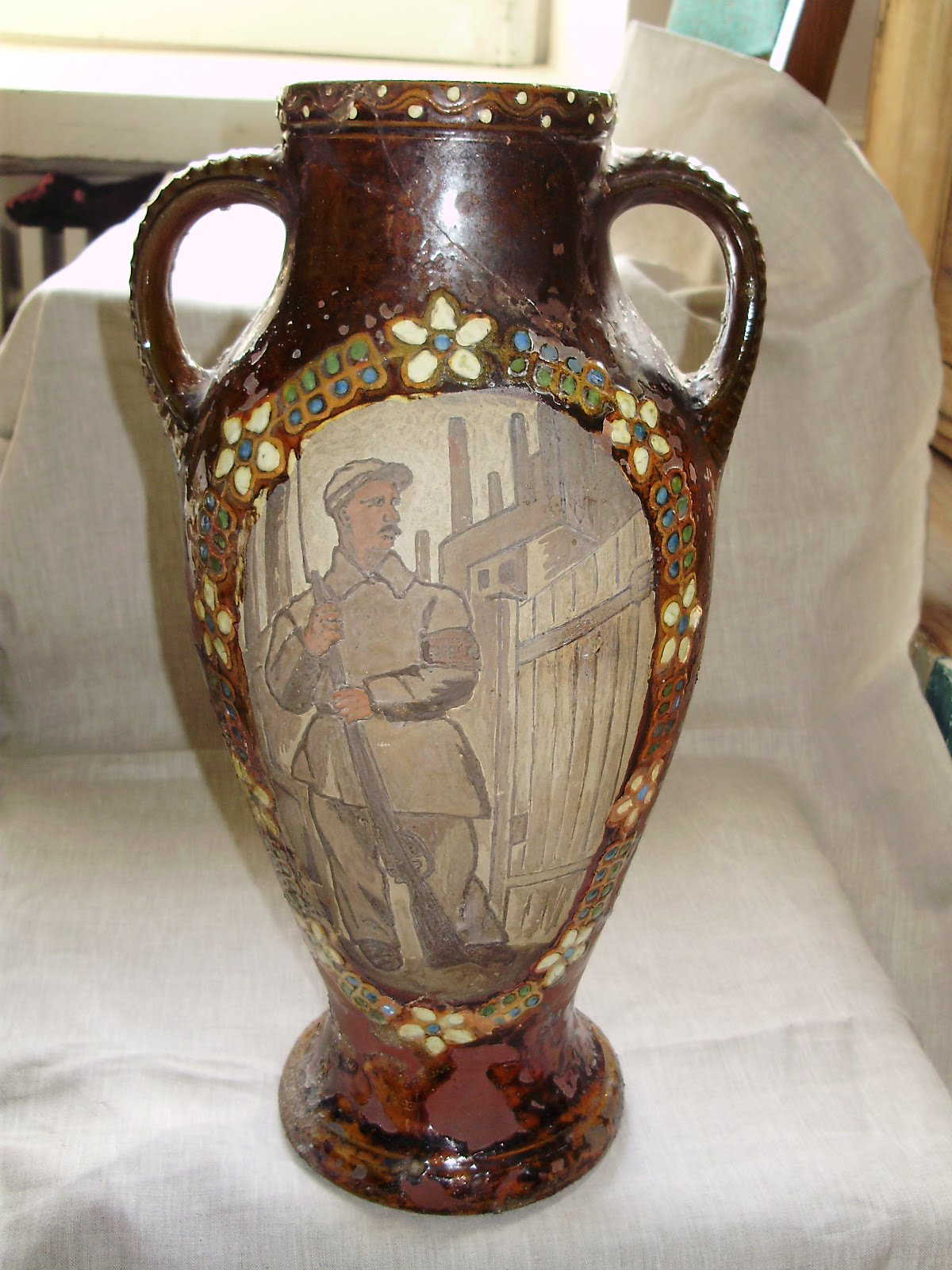
An example of Soviet art combined with Opishnia decorative ceramic

In the first half of the nineteenth century, ceramics from Opishnia were characterised by geometric motifs. During the second half of the century, these motifs were exchanged for the recognisable fliandrivka decoration. One of the most noted potters of this era was Ostap Nochovnyk, who was best known for his figurative works. By 1893, there were 288 potters working in Opishna; for most of them, pottery was their only source of income.

During the twentieth century, the pottery art of Opishnia actively responded to innovations in the social and artistic life of the state. One of the innovations was the use of easel painting elements, which were influenced by Soviet political ideology. The introduction of easel painting elements into Opishnia pottery was initiated by the drawing teacher, icon painter, and painter Petro Kononenko, a graduate of the Stroganov School of Technical Drawing. Potteries in the area also produced ceramic tiles as building decoration in the early twentieth century.

In the early 1930s, images of Red Army soldiers began to appear on pottery based on the influence of Soviet ideology. Semen Datsinka, a resident of Opishnia, born in 1917, recalled:

I studied [at the Opishnya Ceramic Industrial School] until 1933, because students began to die of hunger. My cousin Yemen died in 1933, he was also a student, we sat at the desk together. I did not finish school, no one finished, it was falling apart, there was hunger. However, they gave us [food], we went to the collective farm, we earned money.... Those were school days, it was spring. 1933. I was trading for pears for 15 rubles in Poltava and went to Dnipropetrovsk. There was work there, as a welder. They gave us a kilogram [of bread]. The school was falling apart, more than half.

— Semen Datsinka

As one example, Oksana Babych and Oleksandr Shirai, graduates of the Opishnya School of Ceramic Art in 1939, made a vase depicting two Red Army soldiers riding white horses. The opposite side of the vase is decorated with a painted floral ornament, combining the traditional Opishnia decorative style with Soviet-inspired imagery. During the German occupation, many people wanted to study at the workshop of the pottery artel "Artistic Ceramicist", as rumors circulated in the town that students would not be taken to Germany for forced labor.

Political repression in the 1930s and 1950s affected the pottery industry. Potters Lavrenty Onyshchenko and Feoktyst Moklyak from the village of Mali Budyshcha were sentenced to death on charges of anti-Soviet agitation. Another, Ivan Pichka, was sentenced to 10 years in prison, and a potter from Opishnia, Fedor Zadorozhny, was sentenced to six years in prison. In addition to potters, political repression also affected other residents of Opishnia who were involved in the pottery business, including the heads and employees of pottery establishments, teachers and graduates of the pottery school and researchers.

In 1963, the Opishnia pottery artels "Artistic Ceramicist" and "Red Potter" were merged and transformed into the "Artistic Ceramicist" factory. A positive aspect was the mechanization of clay extraction and preparation of mass for household products. In the 1968 work In Search of Treasures, Ivan Maksimovich Shapoval described how the best potters in Opishnia were trained at the Myrhorod Ceramic School. Pottery was taught to the Opishnians from school age: the students studied the basics of pottery and underwent practice at a ceramic factory. This system operated until 1985.

In 1986, the Pottery Museum was founded in the village by order of the Council of Ministers of Ukraine. It was initially inspired by the film-maker Alexander Dovzhenko. In 2001, the museum became the National Museum of Ukrainian Pottery concerned with the study, preservation, and popularization of Ukraine's pottery heritage. Examples of Opishnia ceramics are also held in overseas collections, such as the Ukrainian Museum of Canada. At the beginning of the twenty-first century, Opishnia ceramics were popular only as souvenirs. This was exploited by traders who sold fakes from China, Turkey, and Donetsk region under the brand name "Opishnya ceramics".

Since 2002, a small private enterprise "Pottery Circle" has been operating in the old premises of the "Art Ceramics Factory," with about 40 people working at the factory. In 2007, Kateryna Shtanko created the "Svyshchyk" postage stamp with a denomination of 5 kopecks. In 2012, ceramics from Opishnia were added to Ukraine's National Inventory of Intangible Cultural Heritage. As a result, the region also hosts the National Pottery Festival. As of 2023, Opishnia continued to be a centre of production of Ukrainian ceramics.

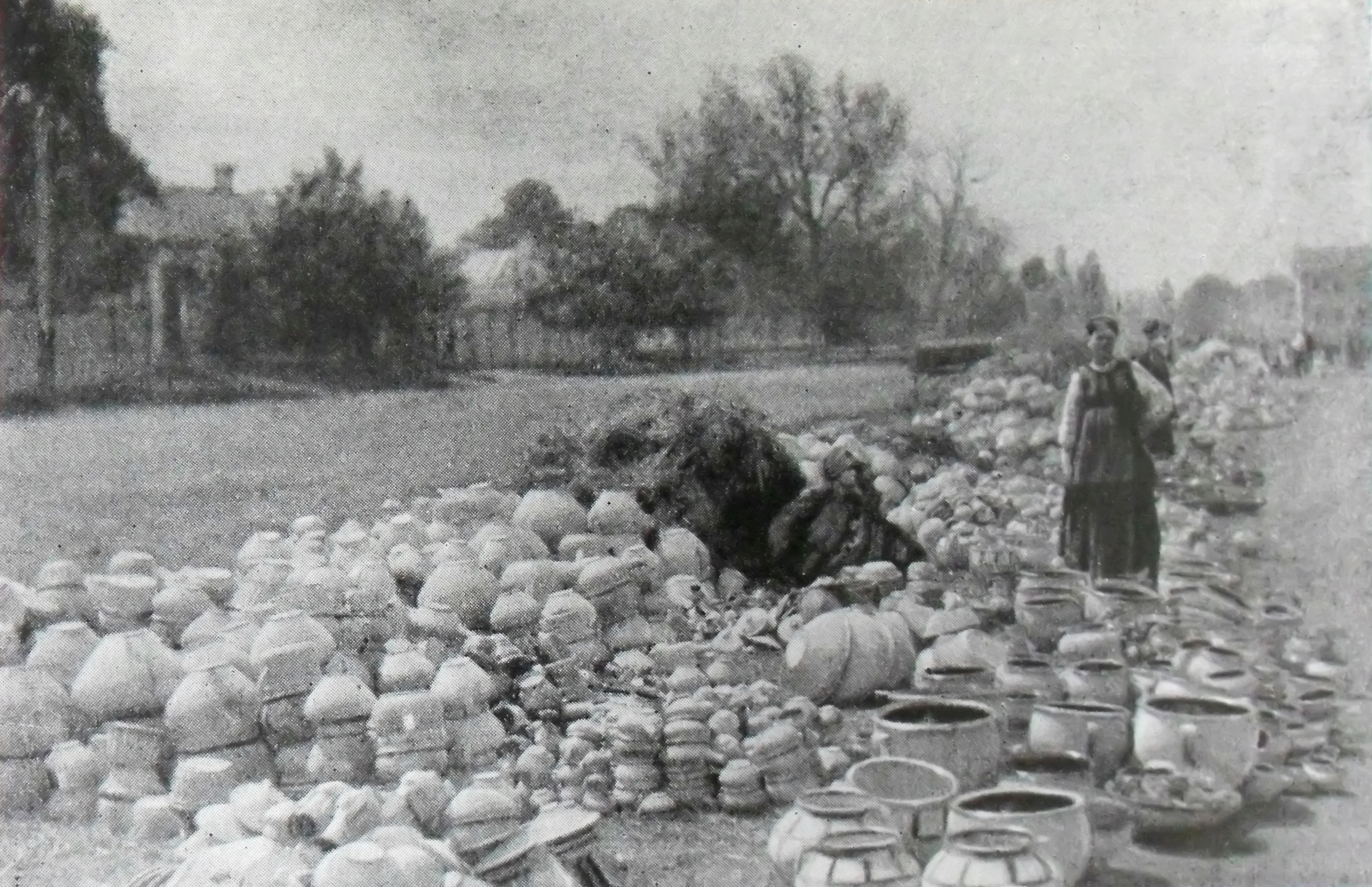
Pottery market in Opishnia, late 19th-century

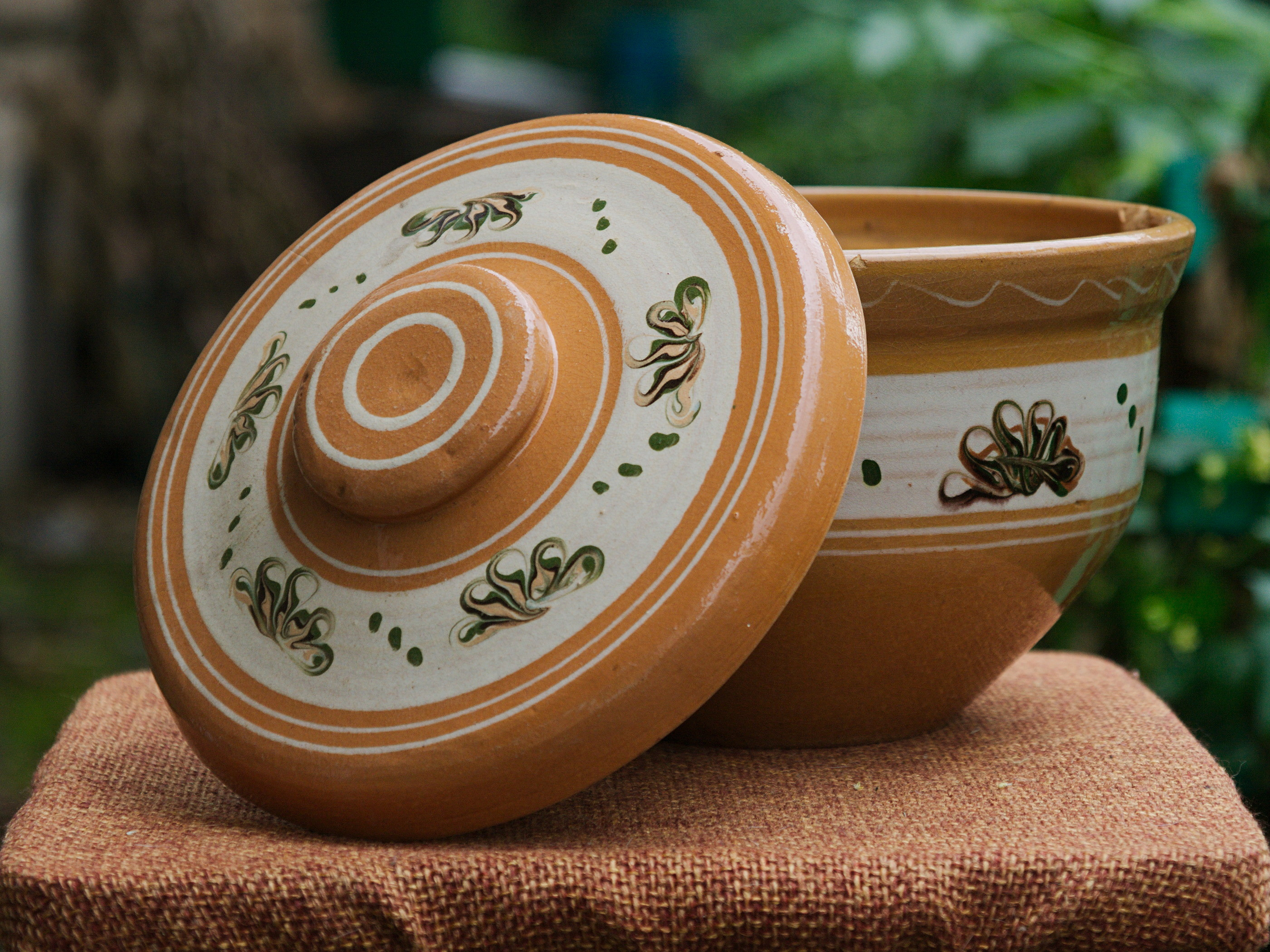
Fliandrivka decoration

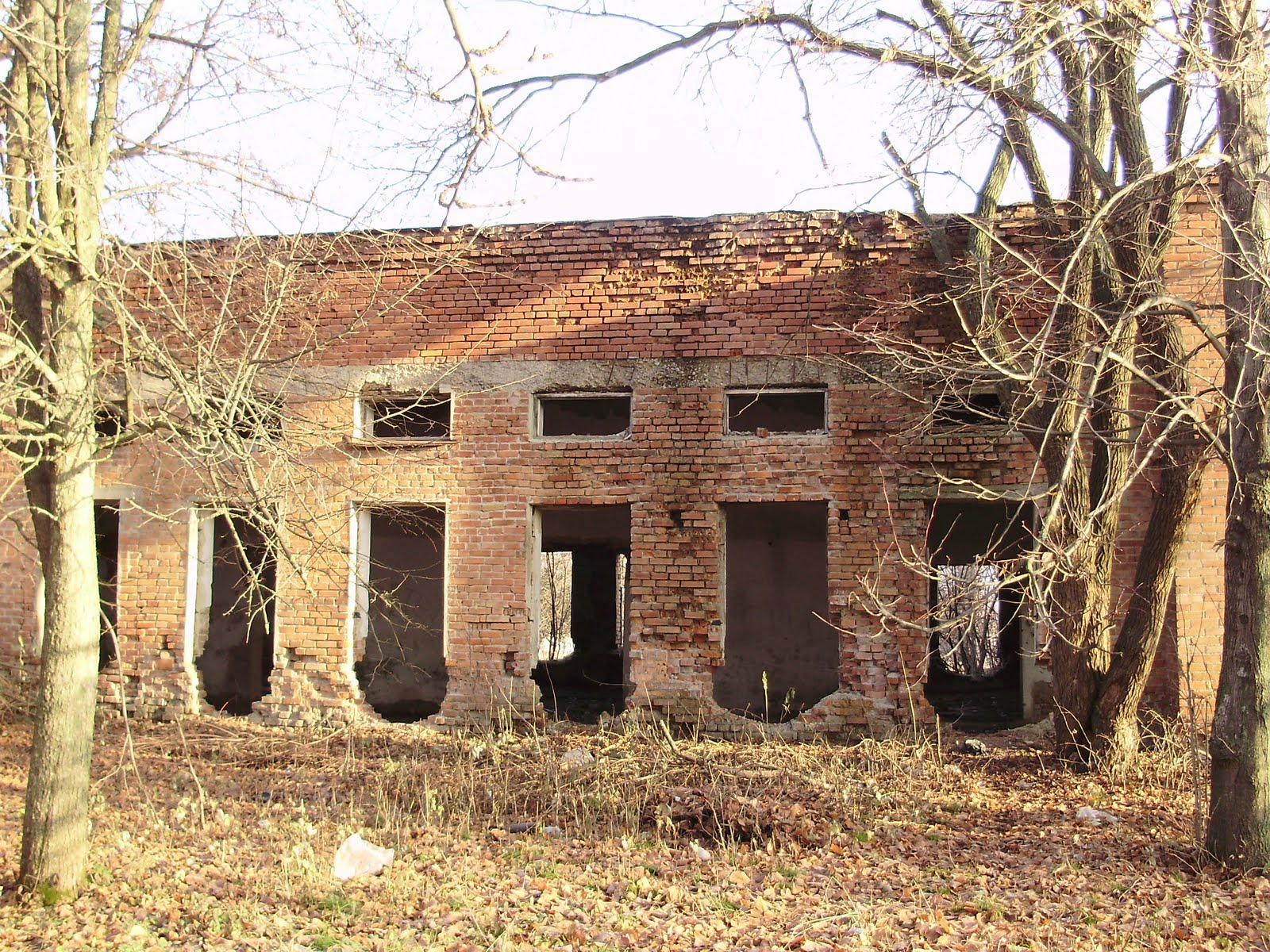
'Artistic Ceramicist' factory, in ruins

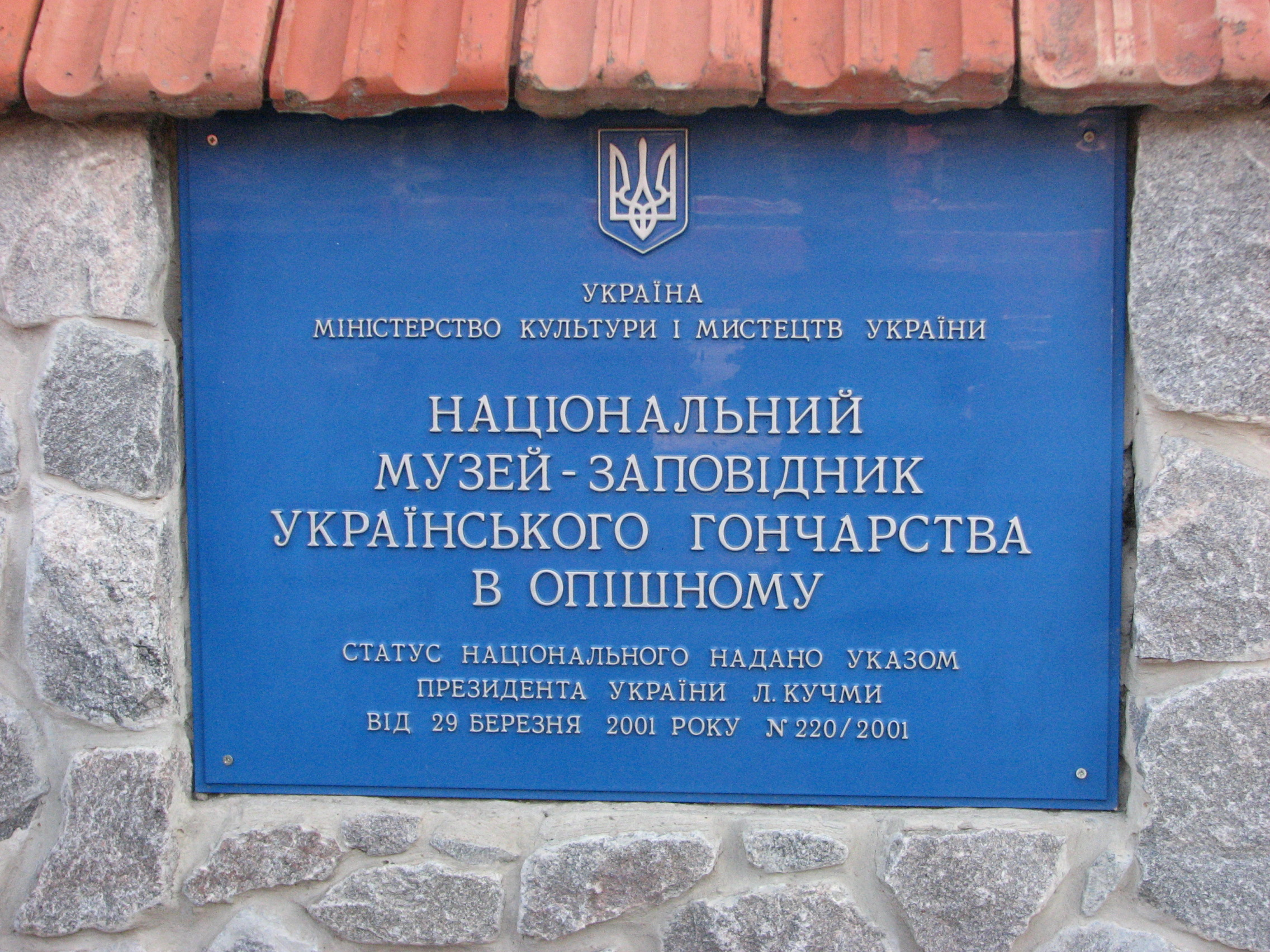
Pottery museum in Opishnia

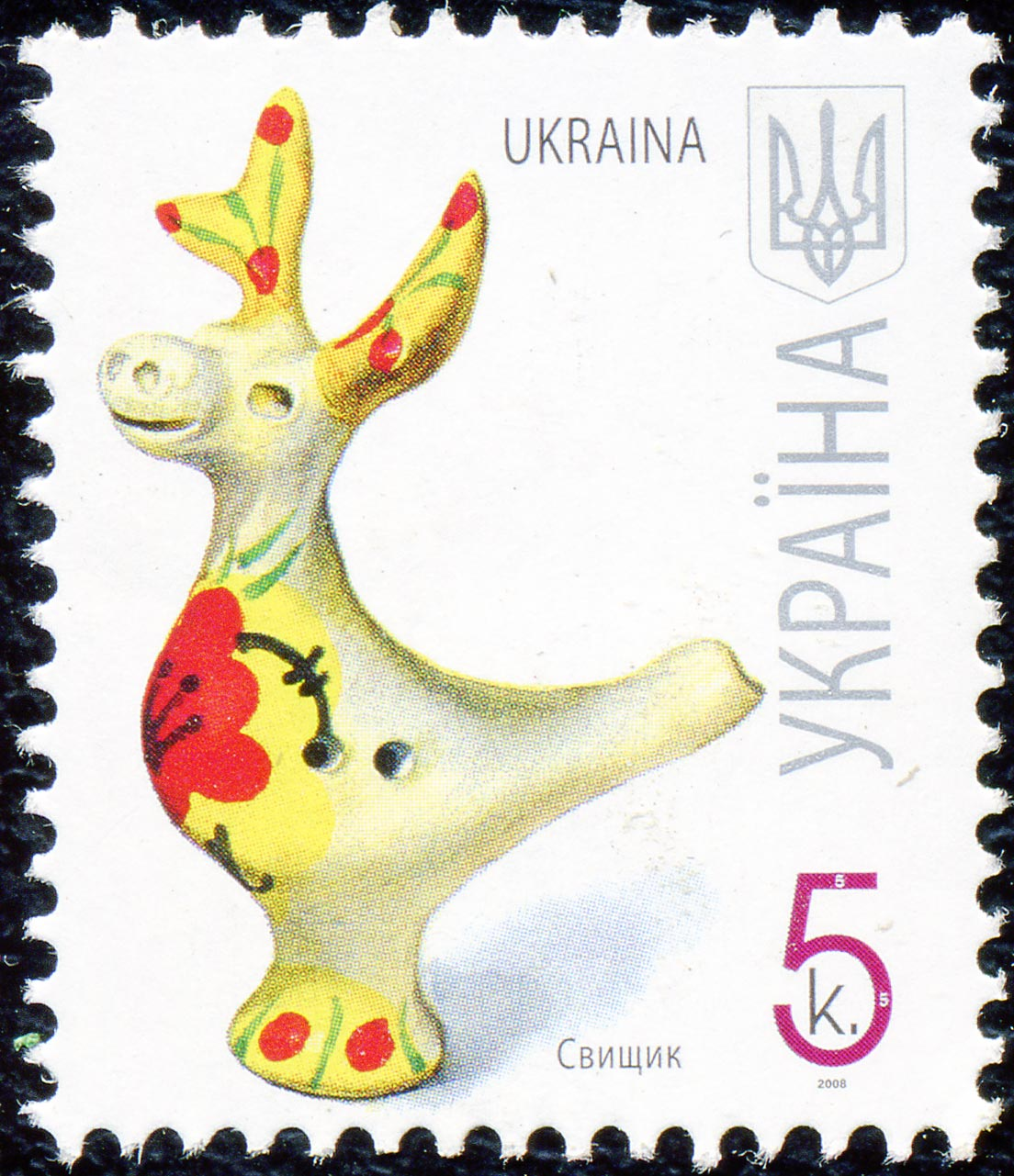
2008 stamp

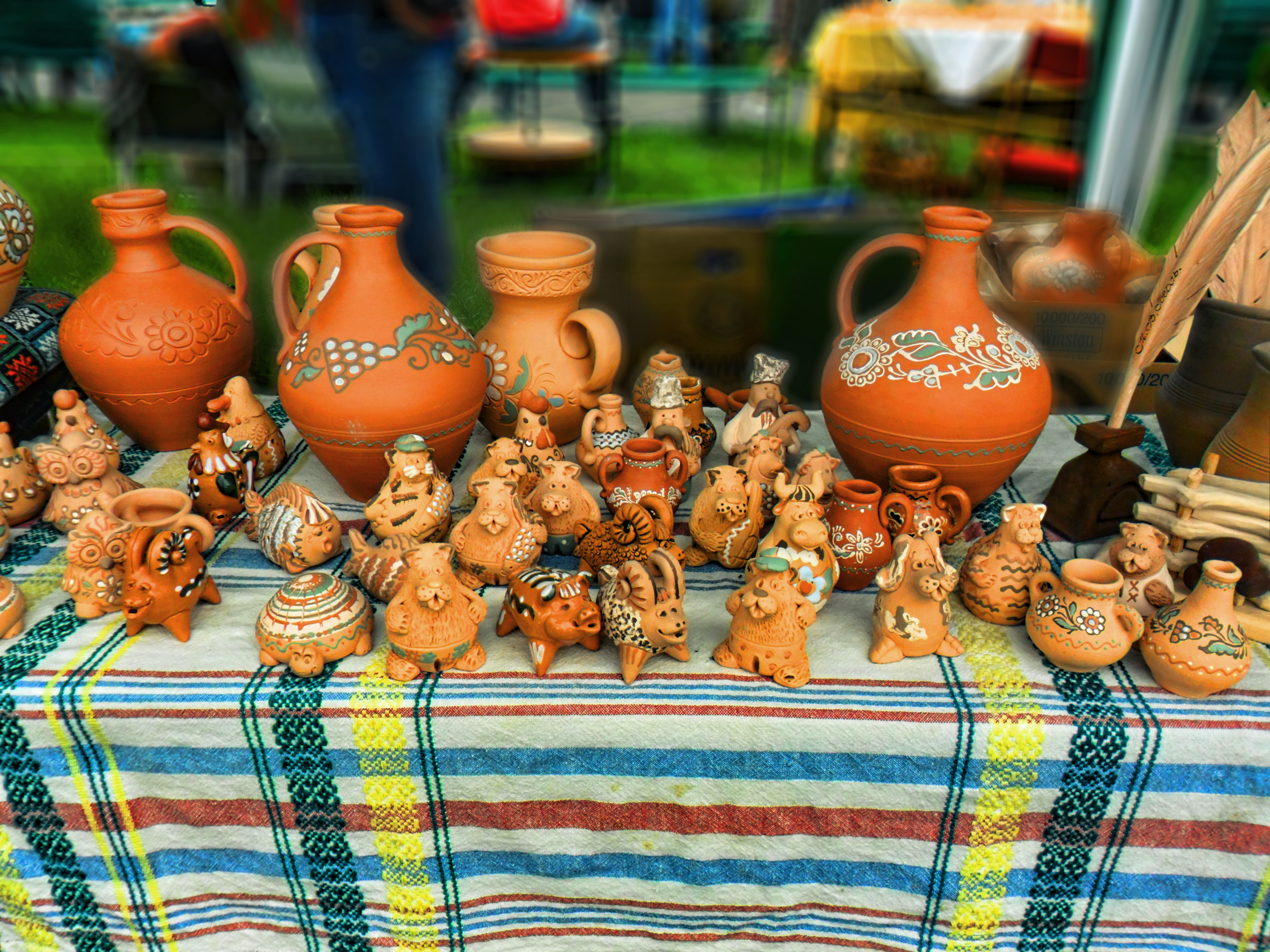
Festival display

== Manufacture ==
Shaping a vessel on a potter's wheel (2011)

The potters of Opishnia create their products without any preliminary sketches. Pottery is made from a local type of clay. It has a grayish color, and when fired, it acquires a light yellow hue. The ceramics undergo a 40-day manufacturing cycle. First, the clay is kneaded on special equipment. After a few days, the craftsman begins to shape the product on the potter's wheel. After molding, the clay dries for a week in natural conditions, without additional heating or ventilation. Then the product is fired in a kiln at 850 to 900 °C, after which it is glazed or painted, and then fired again at the same temperature.

== Decoration ==
Opishnia painting is mostly of plant ornaments: flowers, bunches of grapes, bouquets and wreaths. Characteristic features are the light yellow color of the pattern, made with the natural color of clay, on a red-brown, white or green background.

Colored engobes are used for painting. Products formed on a potter's wheel are first poured with liquid-colored clay, which creates a uniform tone. After a second drying, they are painted using a rubber bulb with a straw on the end; this technique is known as rizhkuvannia. To paint the bowls, an original technique is used, known as fliandrivka, where colours are applied to the vessel with subsequent stretching with a special cooper hook.

== Notable practitioners ==
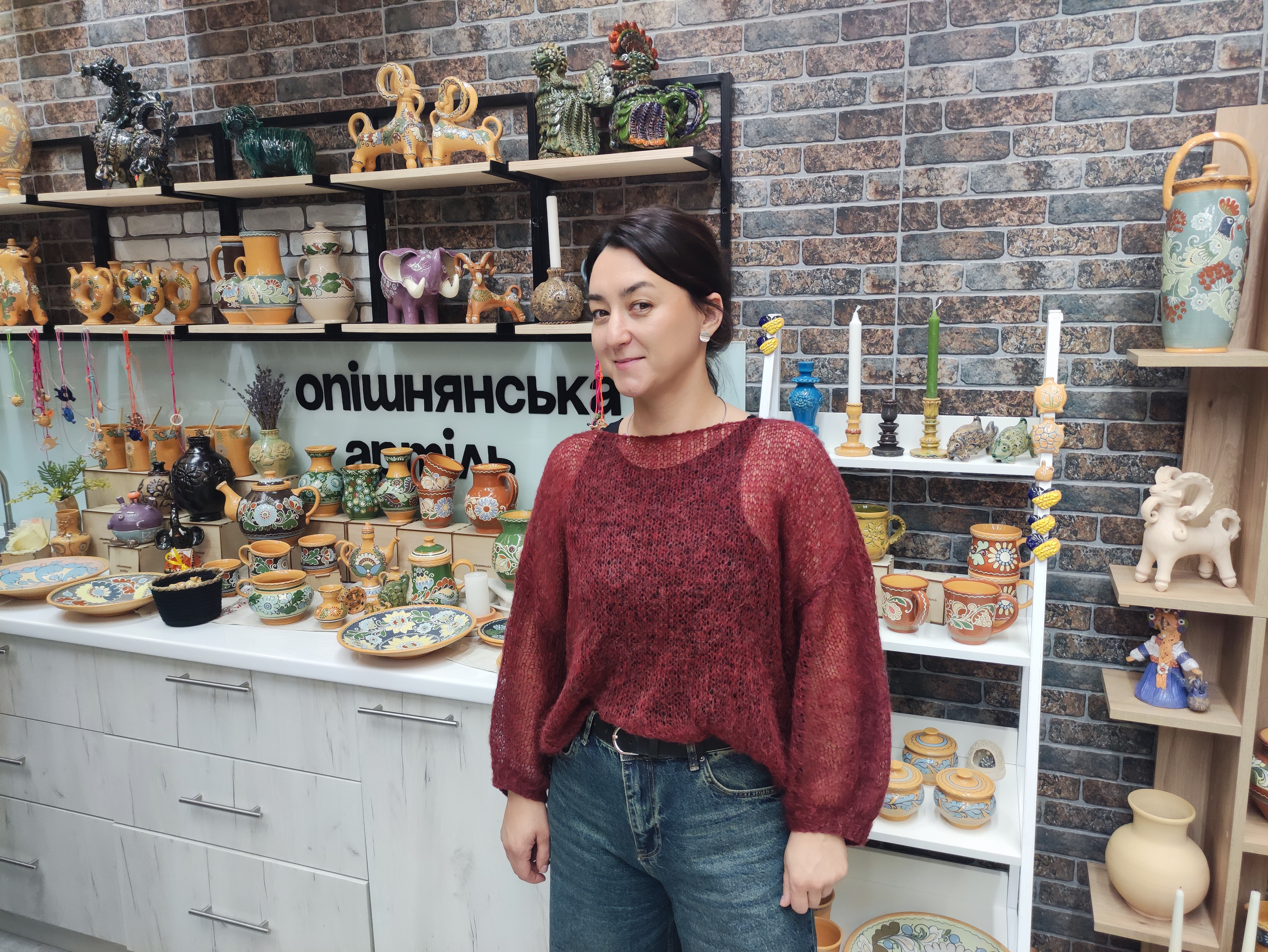
Olga Plokha — a 21st-century Opishnia ceramicist

- Tykhin Shulzhenko was a Ukrainian ceramic master of the late 19th and early 20th centuries.
- Olga Shiyan (1914–2001) was a master of folk ceramic toys and sculpture.
- Oleksandra Selyuchenko (1921–1987) was a Ukrainian ceramist and folk craftswoman.
- Vasyl Porosny (1873–1942) was a Ukrainian Soviet People's Master of Artistic Ceramics.
- Havrylo Poshyvaylo (1909–1991) was a representative of the Opishnya school of artistic ceramics.
- Yavdokha Poshyvaylo (1910–1994) was a pottery artist and representative of the Opishnya school of artistic painting.
- Vasyl Omelyanenko (born 1925) is a potter from Opishnya. Honored Master of Folk Art of the Ukrainian SSR, Laureate of the Danylo Shcherbakivskyi Prize and the Taras Shevchenko National Prize of Ukraine.
- Mykhailo Kytrysh (born 1936) is a Ukrainian potter and sculptor. Laureate of the Taras Shevchenko National Prize of Ukraine.
- Ivan Loboychenko (born 1957) is a Ukrainian potter who specialises in toys and figurines.

== Gallery ==
Shaping a figurine

Potter using treadle wheel

Intergenerational learning

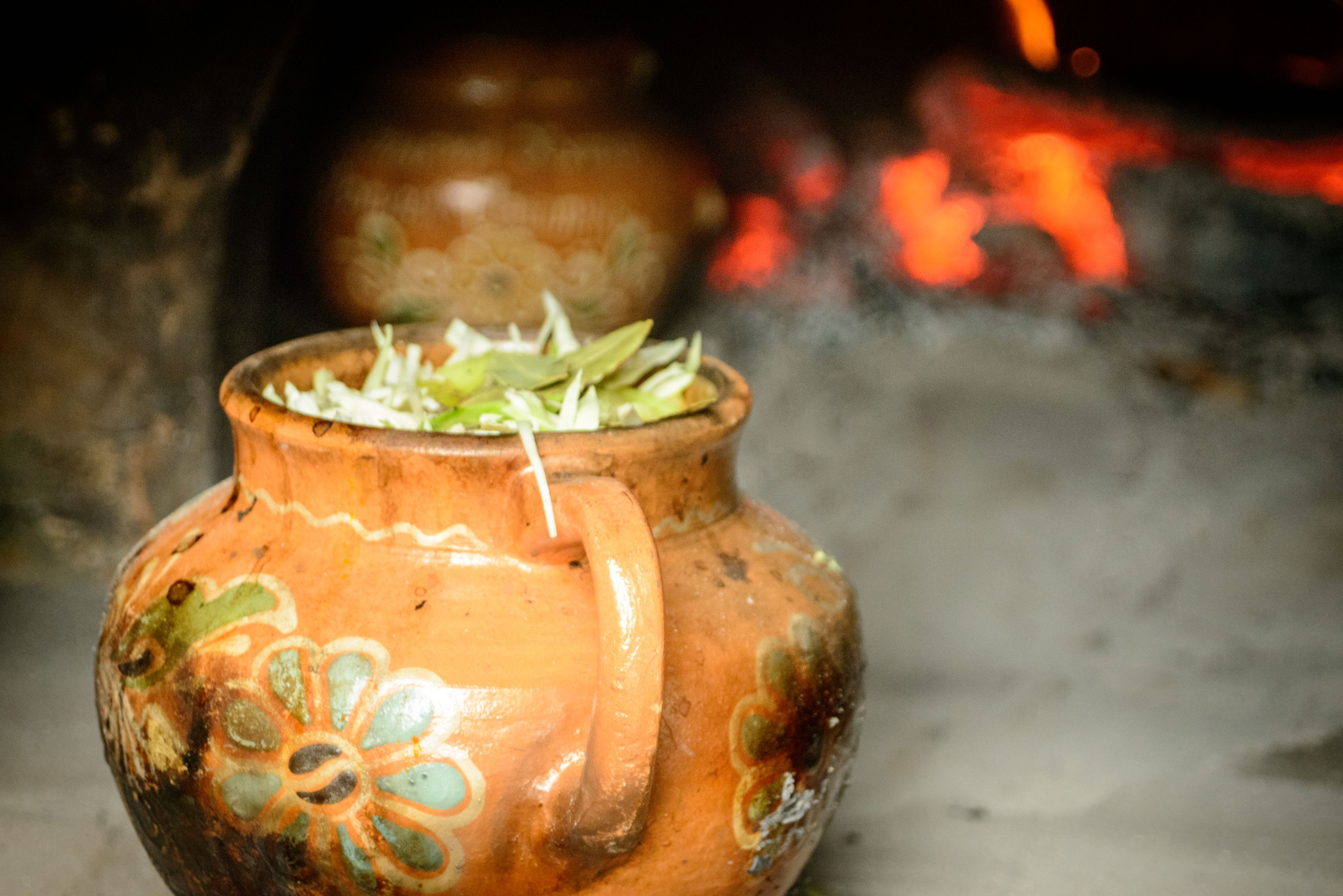
Borscht in an Opishnia vessel

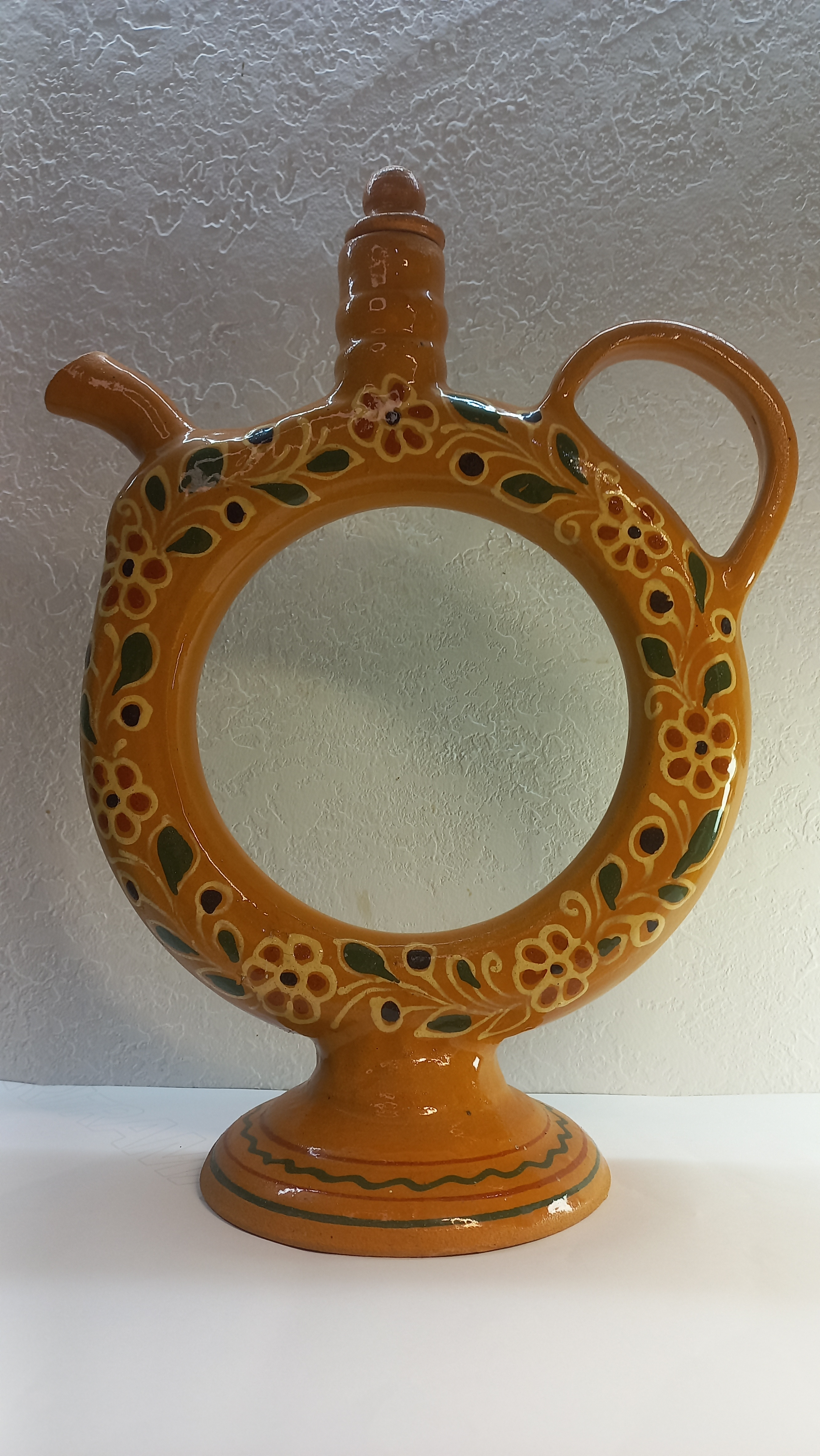
Kumanets — a specialist drinks pitcher

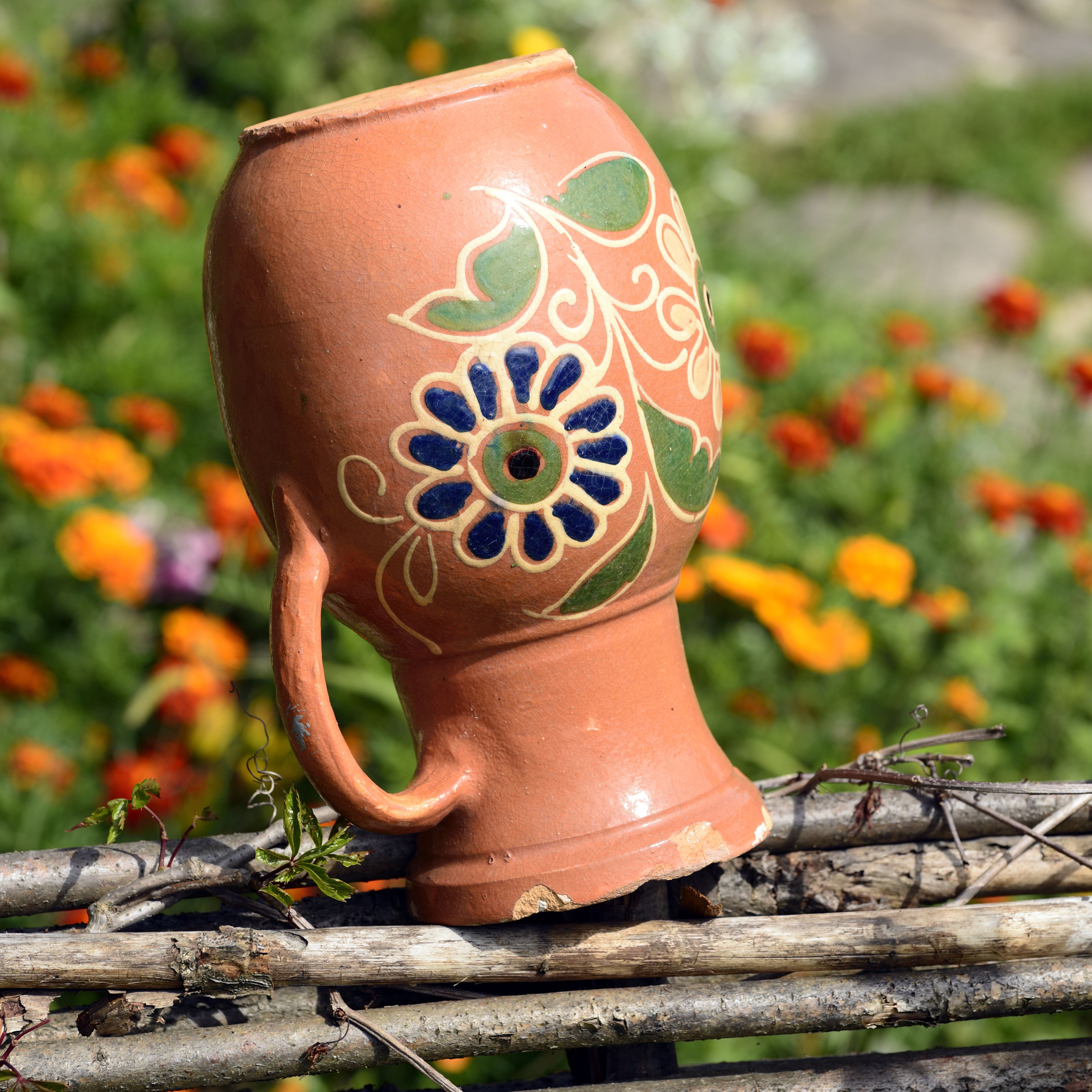
Opishnia vase

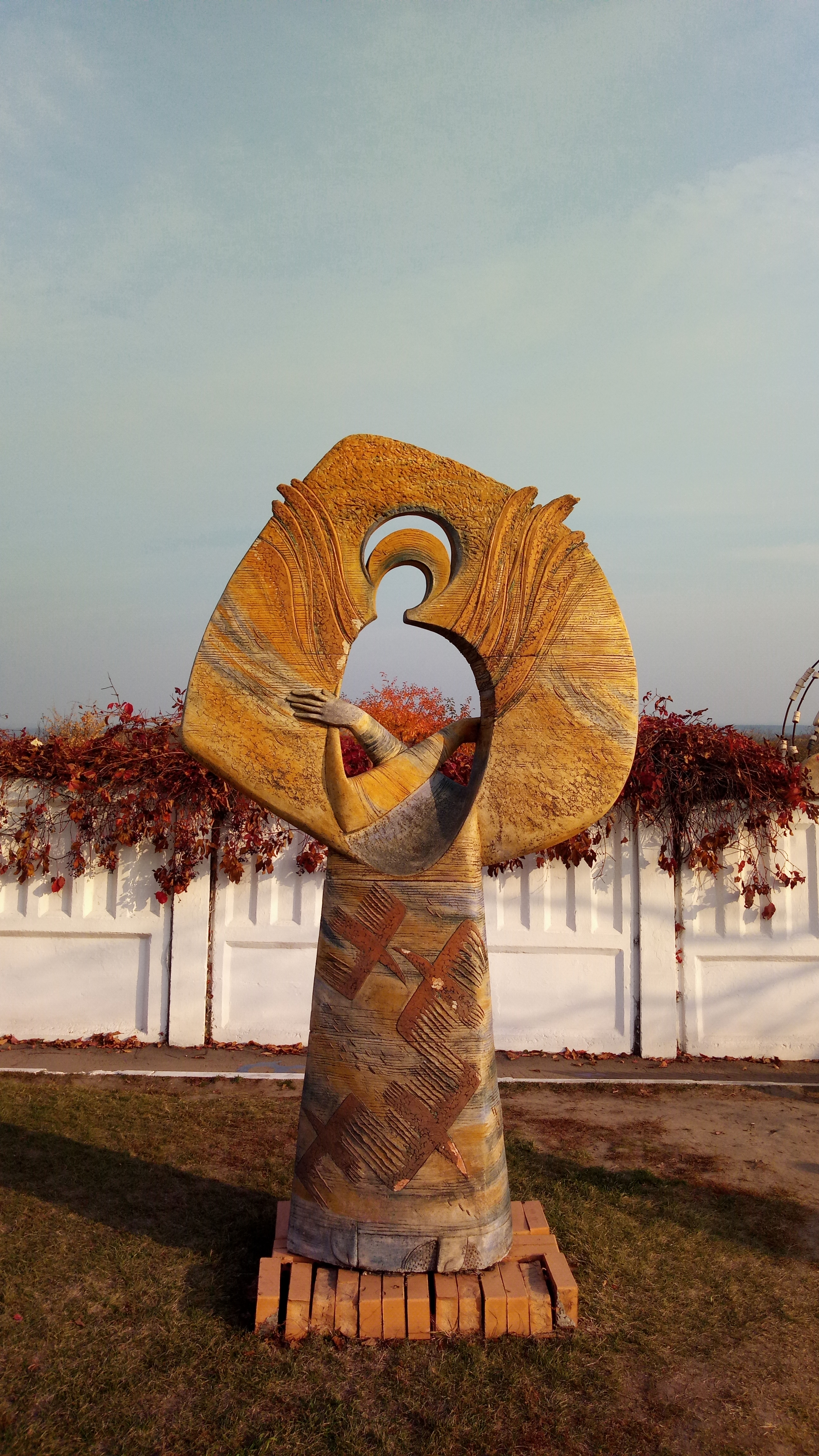
Ukrainian Madonna, National Museum of Ukrainian Pottery

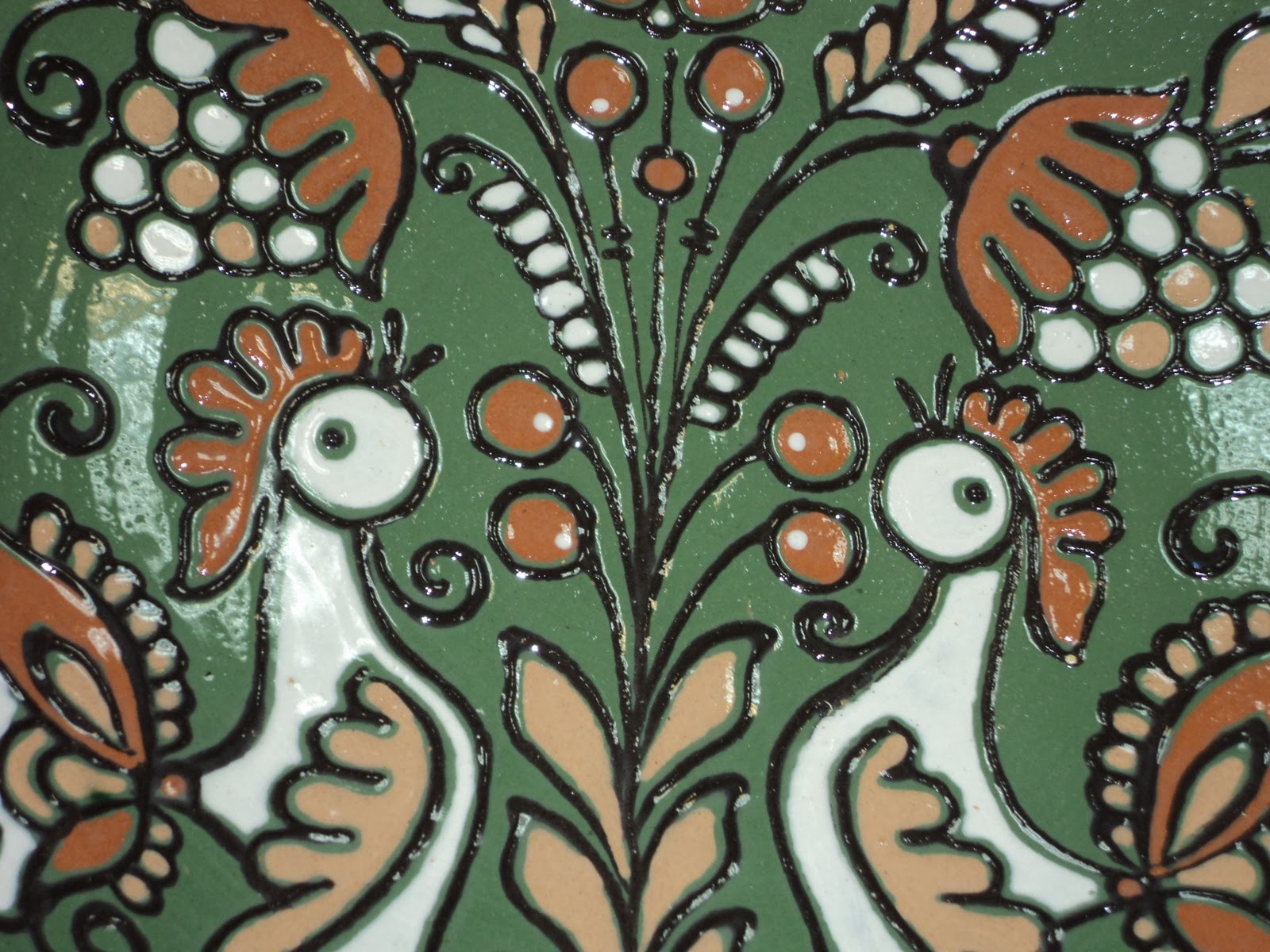
Detail of decoration

Coat of Arms of Opishnia, featuring an Opishnia kumanets

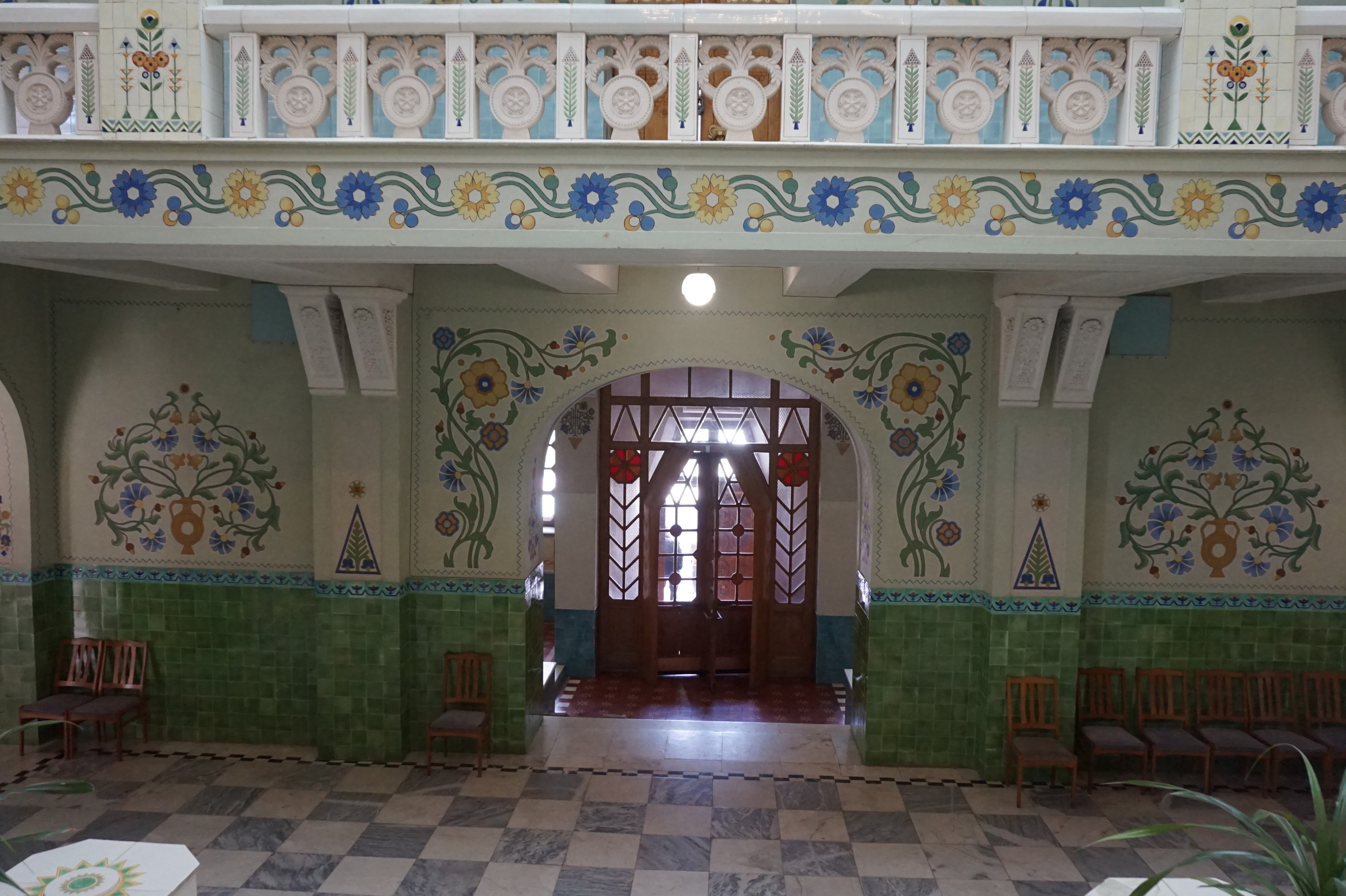
Opishnia-inspired decoration in Poltava Governorate Zemstvo Building
