= Makohin (surname) =

Makohin (Ukrainian: Макогін) is a Ukrainian-language unisex surname literally meaning "makohin". Russian language equivalents: Makogon/Makagon. Notable people with the surname include:

- Jacob Makohin (born 1880), Ukrainian American military and public figure, philanthropist, and pretender nobleman
- Jaroslav Makohin (born 1976), Czech diver of Ukrainian descent
