= Makogon =

Makogon and Makagon are Russian-language unisex surnames, variants of the Ukrainian surname Makohin. Notable people with the surname include:

- Polina Makogon (1919–1943), squadron commander in an all-female Soviet air unit during the World War II
- Pavel Makogon (1872–after 1930), Russian peasant, member of State Duma
- Stanislav Makagon, Kazakhstani footballer
- Vyacheslav Makogon, Ukrainian bodybuilder
