= Opishnia =

Rural locality in Poltava Oblast, Ukraine

Opishnia Опішня
- Rural settlement
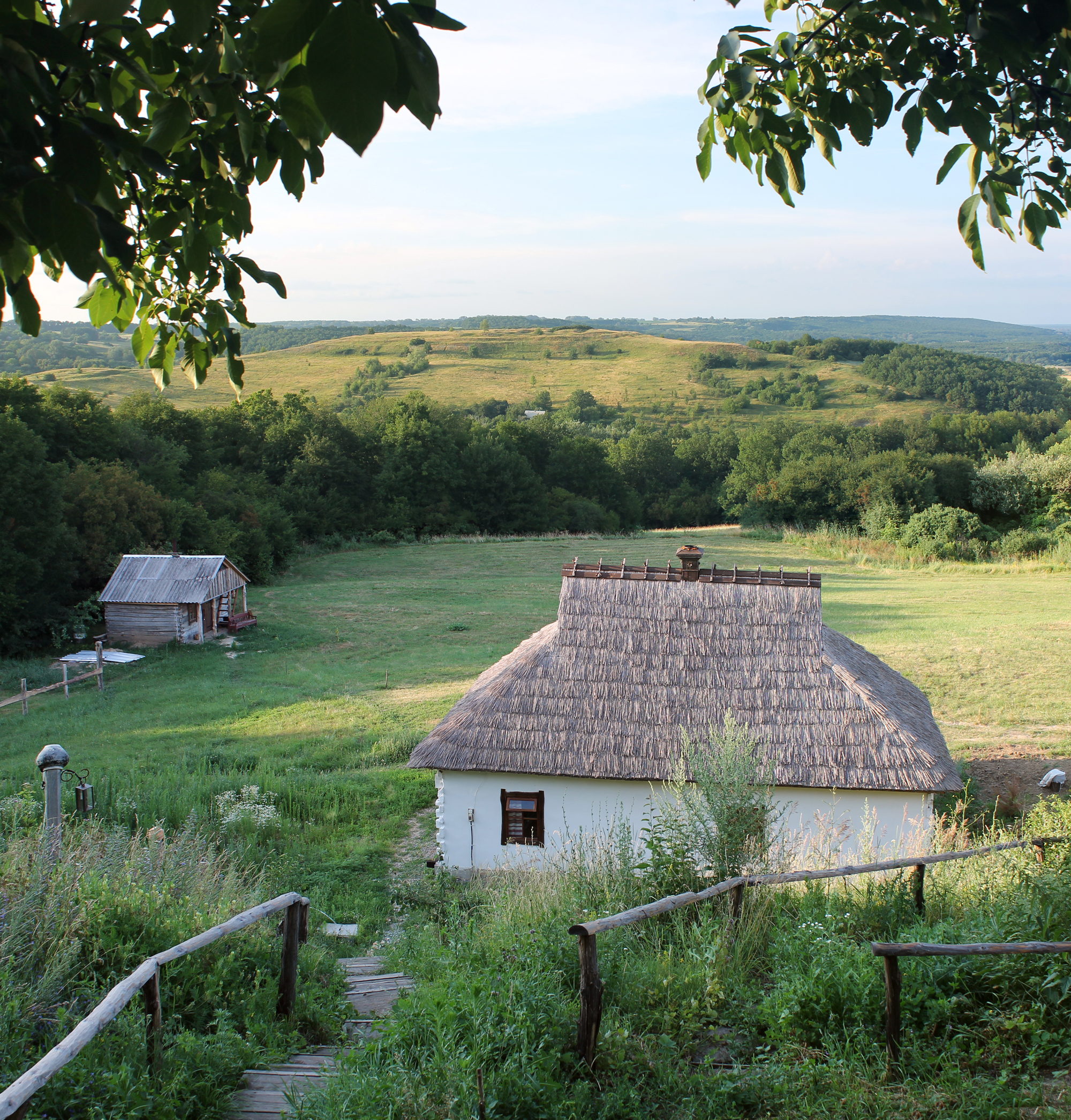

- Flag Coat of arms

- Location in Poltava Oblast Location in Ukraine
- Country: Ukraine
- Oblast: Poltava Oblast
- Raion: Poltava Raion
- Hromada: Opishnia settlement hromada

Population (2022)
  - Total: 5,111
- Time zone: UTC+2 (EET)
  - Summer (DST): UTC+3 (EEST)

Opishnia (Ukrainian: Опішня; Russian: Опошня) is a rural settlement in Poltava Raion, Poltava Oblast, Ukraine. It is located on the right bank of the Vorskla, a tributary of the Dnieper. Opishnia hosts the administration of Opishnia settlement hromada, one of the hromadas of Ukraine. Population: 5,111 (2022 estimate). The settlement is well-known for its ceramics.

== History ==
The settlement is a centre for traditional production of decorative ceramics, and has been since the nineteenth century.

Historically, Opishnia was also famous for its plums. Unlike modern fruit, which are usually eaten raw, they were normally salted in brine or dried as prunes. Especially popular during the 18th and 19th centuries, plums from Opishnia became a trademark product of Poltava Governorate and were also exported to Kharkiv, getting mentioned in works by authors including Ivan Kotliarevsky, Oleksa Storozhenko and Ivan Aksakov.

Until 18 July 2020, Opishnia belonged to Zinkiv Raion. The raion was abolished in July 2020 as part of the administrative reform of Ukraine, which reduced the number of raions of Poltava Oblast to four. The area of Zinkiv Raion was merged into Poltava Raion.

Until 26 January 2024, Opishnia was designated urban-type settlement. On this day, a new law entered into force which abolished this status, and Opishnia became a rural settlement.

== Economy ==
=== Transportation ===
The closest railway station is in Poltava, approximately 50 kilometres (31 mi) south.

The settlement has access to highway H12 connecting Poltava and Sumy. It is also connected by road to Lubny via Myrhorod.
