= Makitra =

Clay mixing bowl with a rough surface

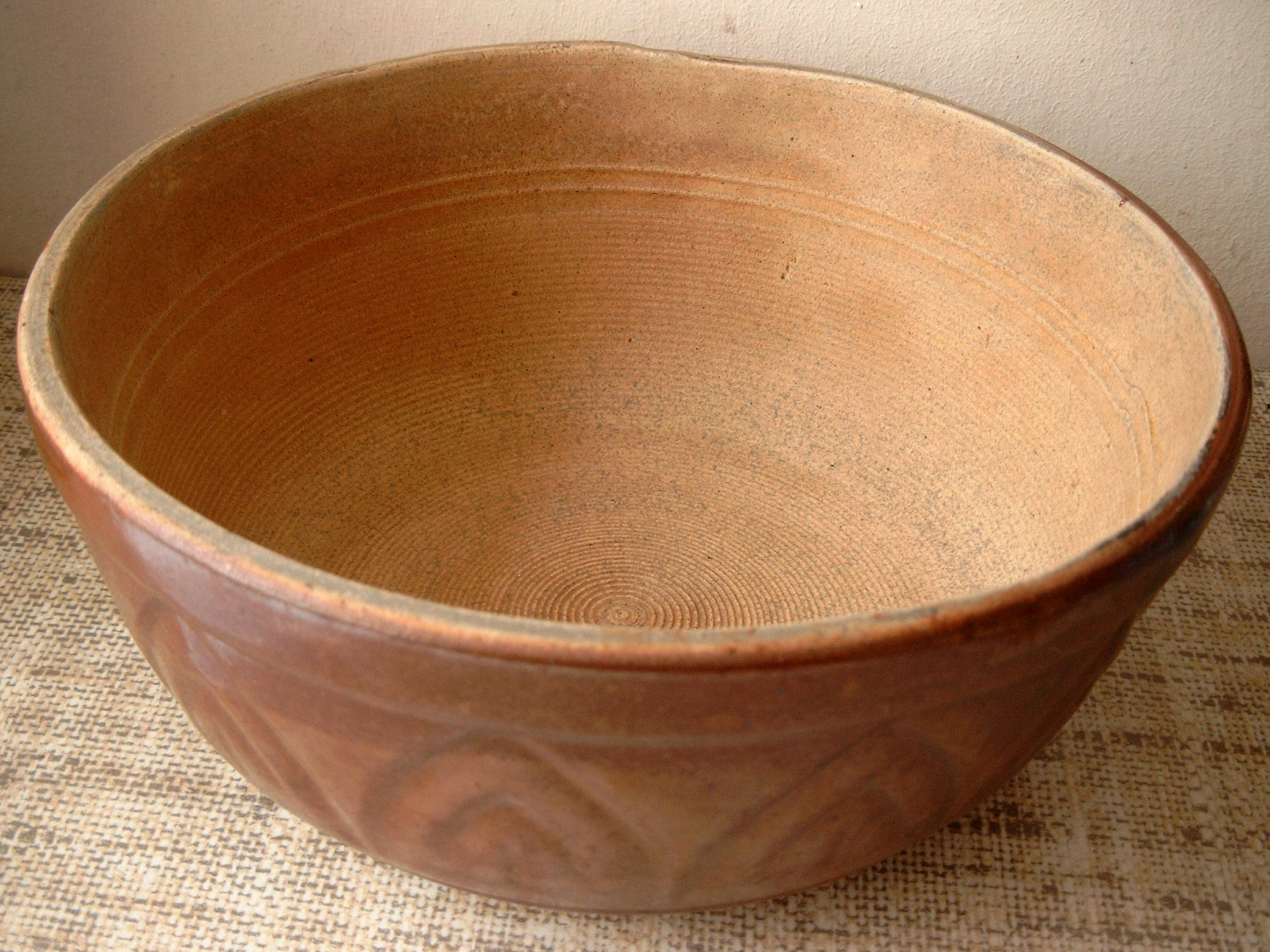
A makitra - notice the horizontal grooves on the inside

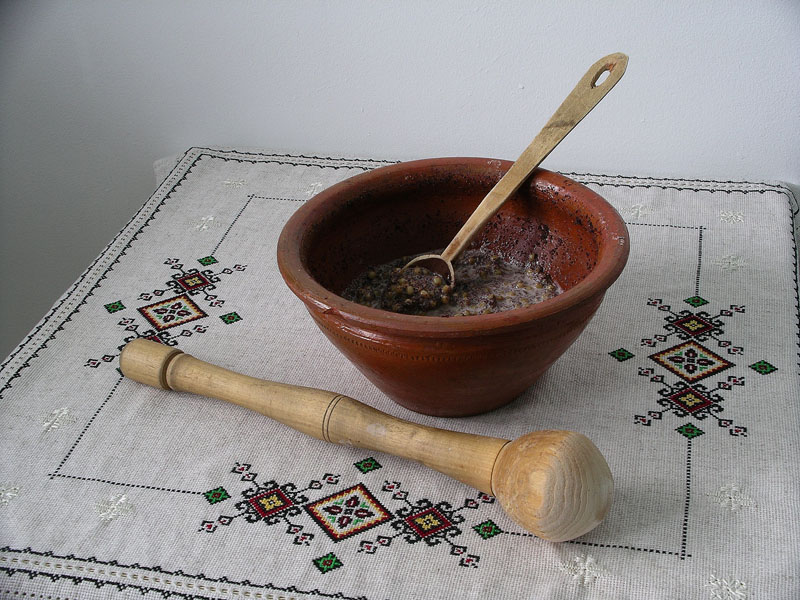
A small makitra and a grinding stick next to it

A makitra (Polish: makutra) is a big clay mixing bowl with a rough surface. With the help of a special (usually wooden, rarely porcelain) grinding stick with a ball-shaped end (called makohin in Ukraine), a makitra can be used for creaming cake batter, eggs with sugar, buttercream, quark for cheese cake, and poppy seeds for kutia. It is perhaps most used in Eastern European kitchens, for example in Poland and Ukraine.

A similar tool, called suribashi, is used in Japanese cuisine.
