= Makohin =

Wooden pestle to grind cooking ingredients

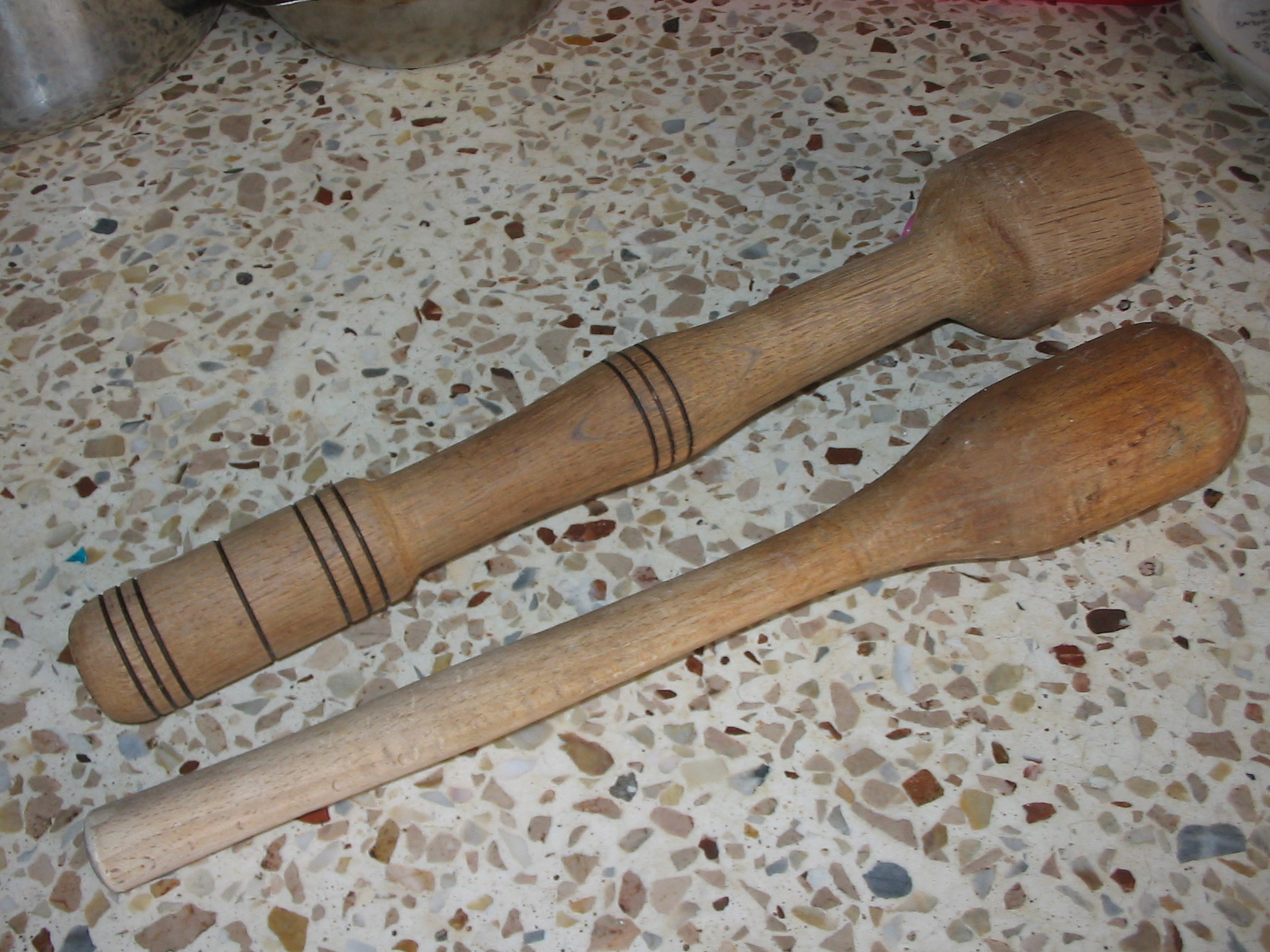
Two makohins

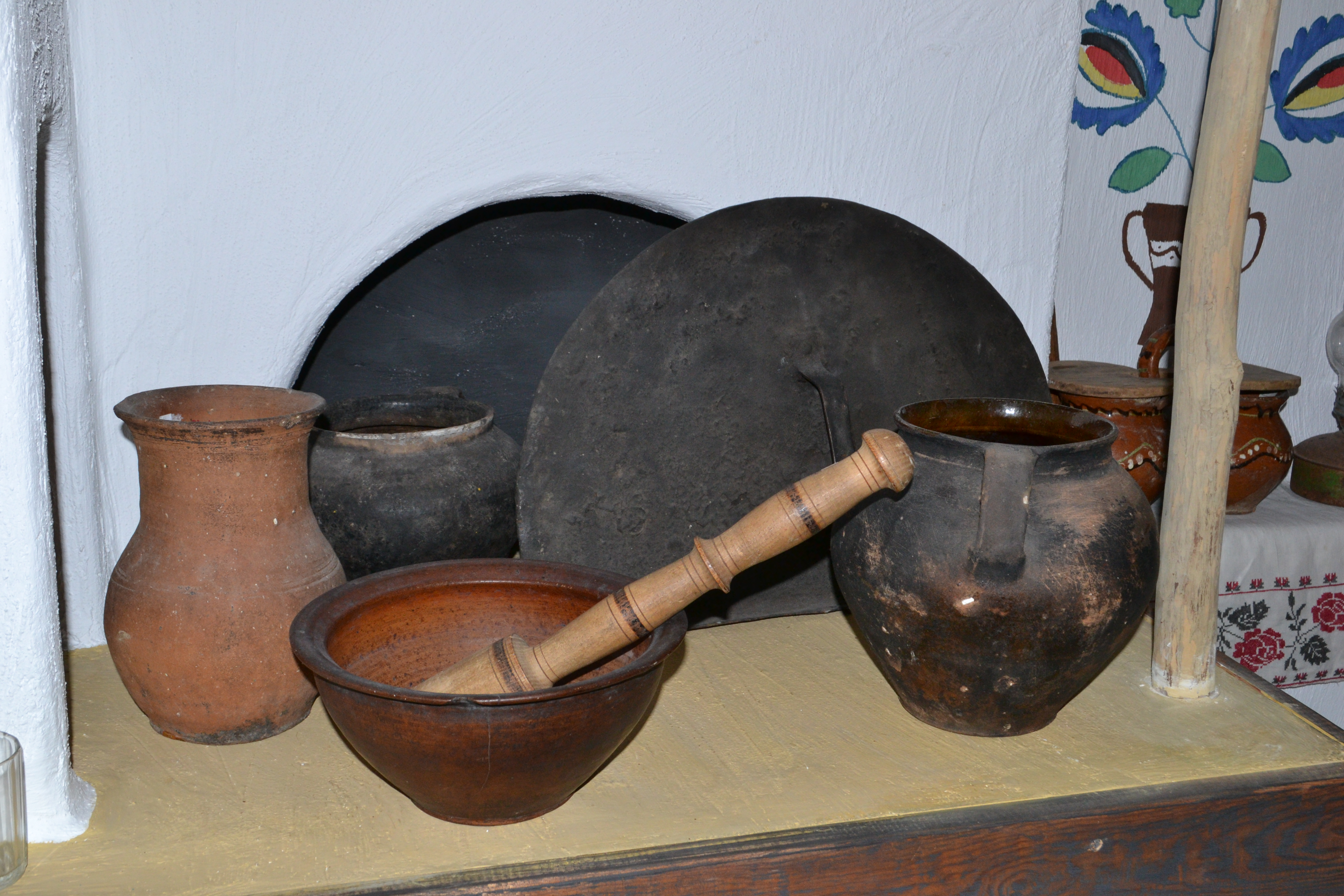
A makitra with a makohin inside among other traditional kitchen utensils

A makohin (Ukrainian: макогін) is kitchen utensil in Ukrainian cuisine, which is a wooden club-shaped pestle used to crush and grind poppy seeds, flax seeds, millet, salt etc. in a makitra, a kind of mixing bowl.

The etymology is "mak-"=poppy + "-o-" (interfix) + "-hin" (and ending derived from the verb hnaty, гнати, "to drive"), i.e., a tool used to crush poppy seeds required for the preparation of the traditional ritual Christmas meal called Christmas kutia.
