= Bobryk =

Village in Poltava Oblast, Ukraine

Bobryk Бобрик
- Village
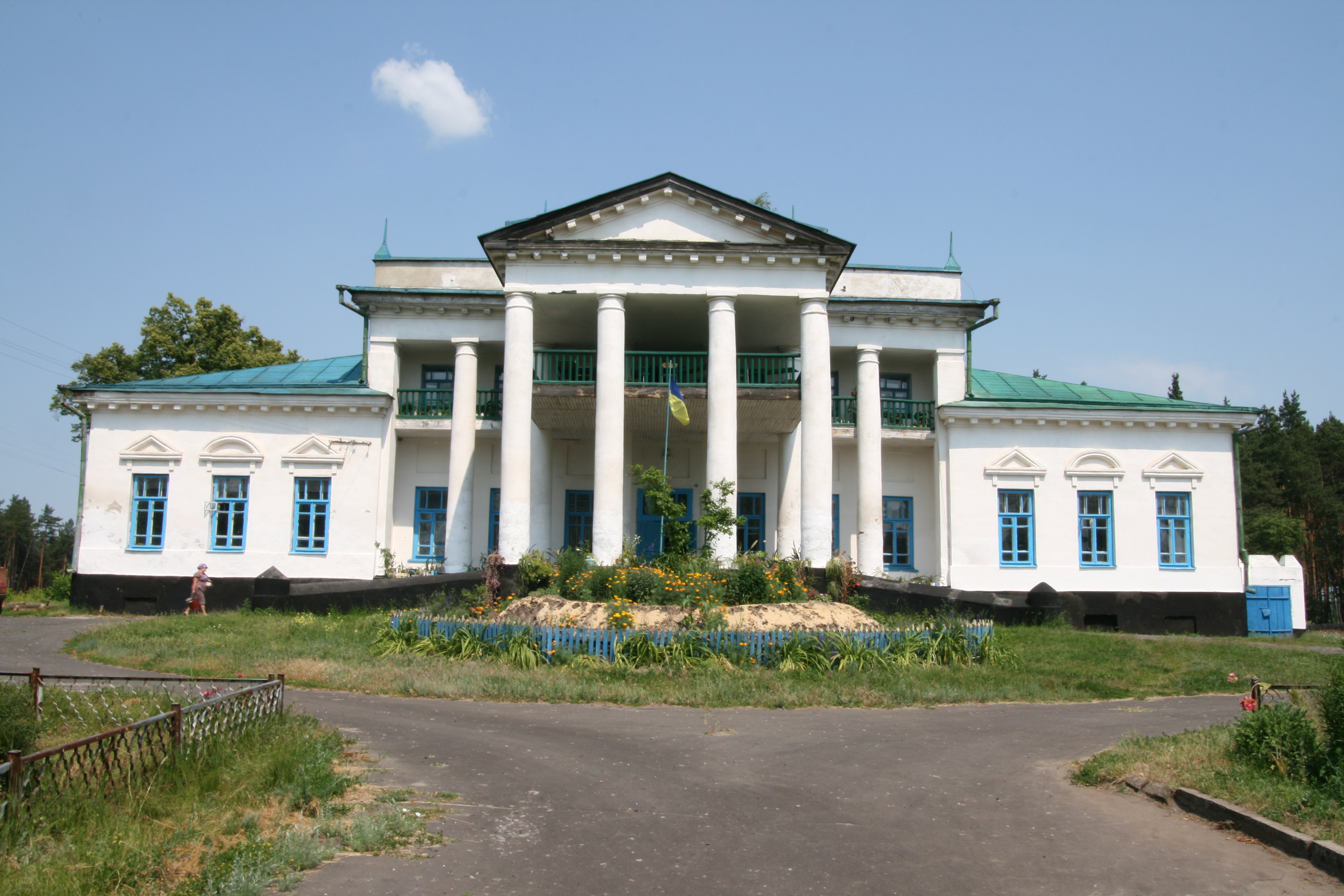
- Masyukov manor house

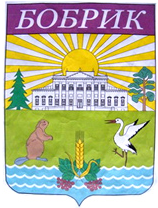
- Coat of arms

- Location within Poltava Oblast Location within Ukraine
- Coordinates: 50°25′0″N 34°14′42″E
- Country: Ukraine
- Oblast: Poltava Oblast
- Raion: Myrhorod Raion

Area
  - Total: 4.299 km^{2} (1.660 sq mi)
- Elevation: 113 m (371 ft)

Population
  - Total: 791

Bobryk (Ukrainian: Бобрик) is a village in Myrhorod Raion, Poltava Oblast, Ukraine. It belongs to Velyki Budyshcha rural hromada, one of the hromadas of Ukraine. It has a population of 791. The local self-government body is the Bobrytska village council. The village of Bobryk is located on the left bank of the Psel River, downstream at a distance of 4.5 km is the village of Vepryk. The river in this place is winding, forming estuaries, and old and marshy lakes. It is located 22 kilometers from the district center and 24 kilometers to the Hadiach railway station. It has an elevation of 113 meters.

Until 18 July 2020, Bobryk belonged to Hadiach Raion. The raion was abolished in July 2020 as part of the administrative reform of Ukraine, which reduced the number of raions of Poltava Oblast to four. The area of Hadiach Raion was merged into Myrhorod Raion.

In 2022, it was invaded and captured by Russian forces for some time.
