= Hoholeve =

Rural locality in Poltava Oblast, Ukraine

Hoholeve Гоголеве
- Rural settlement
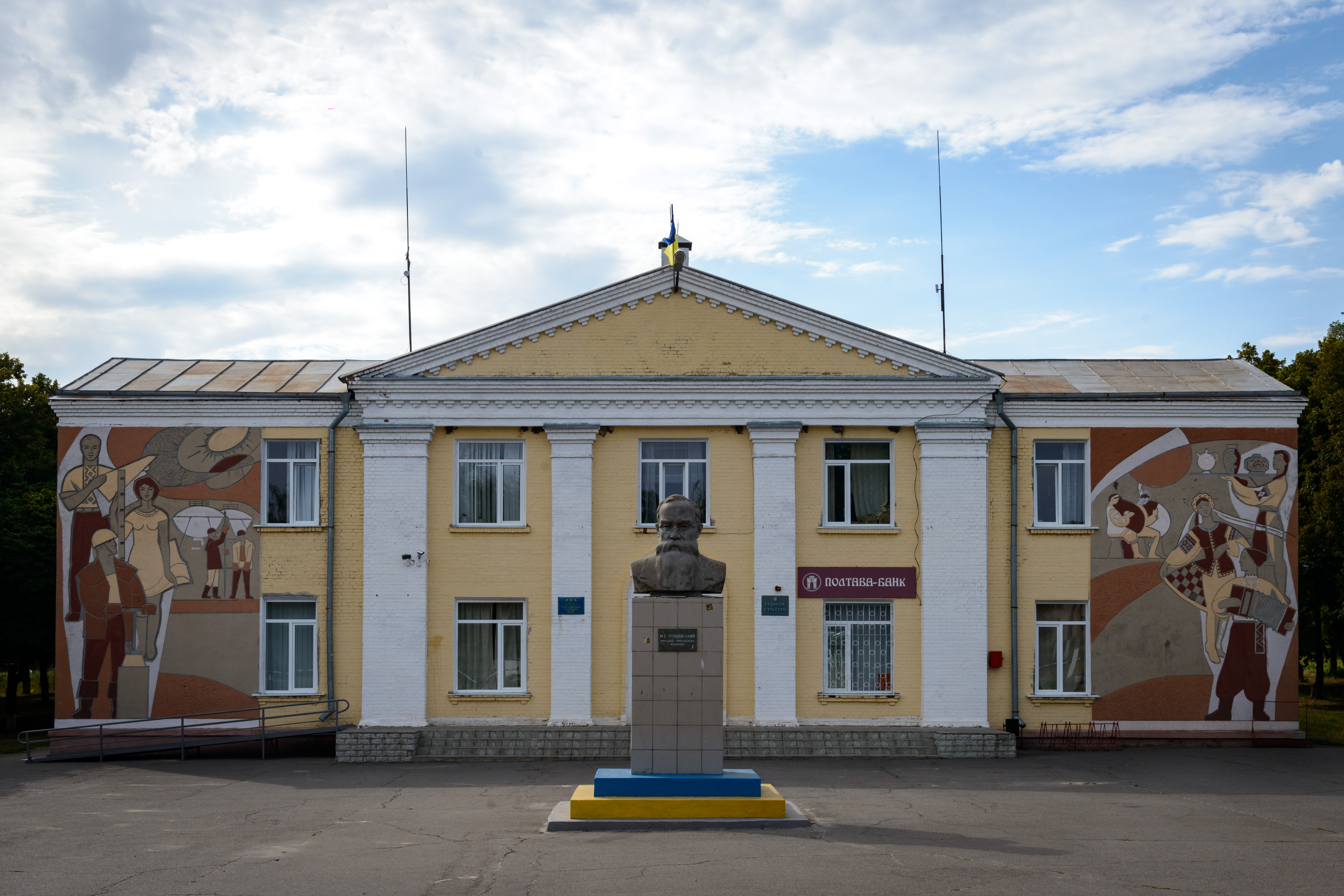

- Location in Poltava Oblast Location in Ukraine
- Country: Ukraine
- Oblast: Poltava Oblast
- Raion: Myrhorod Raion
- Hromada: Hoholeve settlement hromada

Population (2022)
  - Total: 2,465
- Time zone: UTC+2 (EET)
  - Summer (DST): UTC+3 (EEST)

Hoholeve (Ukrainian: Гоголеве; Russian: Гоголево) is a rural settlement in Myrhorod Raion, Poltava Oblast, Ukraine. It is located in a steppe approximately 50 kilometres (31 mi) northwest of the city of Poltava. Hoholeve hosts the administration of Hoholeve settlement hromada, one of the hromadas of Ukraine. Population: 2,465 (2022 estimate).

== History ==
Until 18 July 2020, Hoholeve belonged to Velyka Bahachka Raion. The raion was abolished in July 2020 as part of the administrative reform of Ukraine, which reduced the number of raions of Poltava Oblast to four. The area of Velyka Bahachka Raion was merged into Myrhorod Raion.

Until 26 January 2024, Hoholeve was designated urban-type settlement. On this day, a new law entered into force which abolished this status, and Hoholeve became a rural settlement.

== Economy ==
=== Transportation ===
Hoholeve railway station is on the railway connecting Poltava with Romodan with further connections to Kyiv via Hrebinka, Bakhmach, and Kremenchuk. There is infrequent passenger traffic.

The settlement has road access to Myrhorod, Poltava, and Lubny.
