= Kolos Stadium (Velyka Bahachka) =

Stadium in Velyka Bahachka, Ukraine

- Стадіон Колос
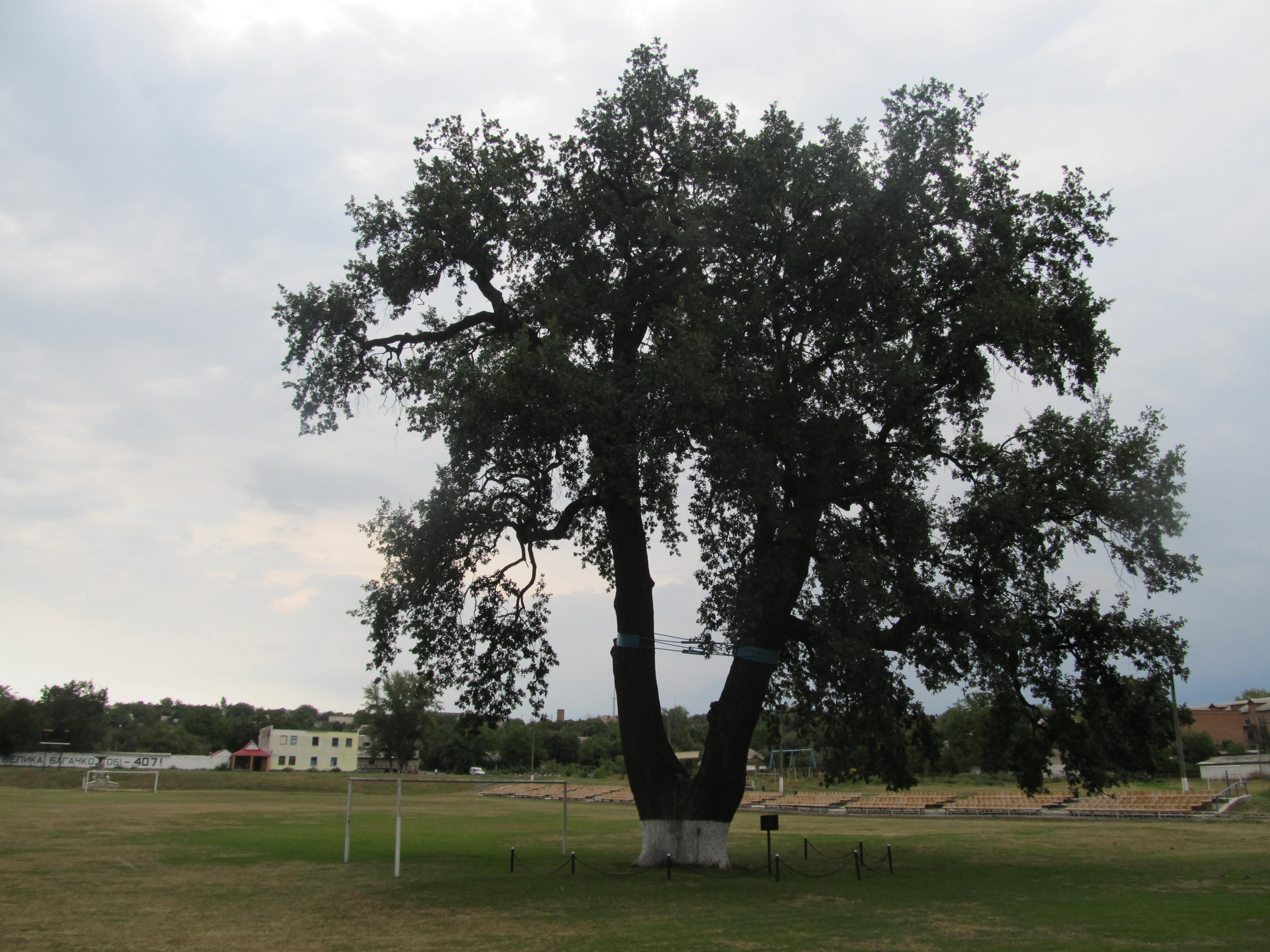
- Interactive map of Kolos Stadium
- Location: Velyka Bahachka, Ukraine
- Coordinates: 49°47′34.2″N 33°43′23.1″E
- Capacity: 1,500
- Surface: Grass
- Field size: 104 m × 69 m (341 ft × 226 ft)

Construction
- Groundbreaking: 1951
- Built: 1952
- Opened: 1952; 74 years ago
- Renovated: 2008-2009, 2021
- Expanded: 1973, 2003, 2005

Tenants
- FC Velyka Bahachka (2004–present); Kharchovyk Velyka Bahachka (1971–1984)

Kolos Stadium (Ukrainian: Стадіон Колос) is a football stadium in Velyka Bahachka, Ukraine. It is the home stadium of FC Velyka Bahachka.

Construction of the stadium and sports grounds began in 1951. Stadium is located in the center of the village. A 750 year old oak tree is located near the stadium. Stadium was completed in 1952. Kolhospnyk sports society Pylyp Zhuravel initiated the construction. In 1973 the stadium was expanded with the addition of a central stand. In 2003 a new central stand was completed. During 2005 a minifootball field was added. During 2008-09 stadium was renovated and plastic seating for 1,500 were installed. During 2021 a multi functional sports field was added.

Stadium is named for Mykhailo Kushneryk, a physical education teacher at a local school from 1961 to 1998. He was a former Kolhospnyk Velyka Bahachka player and manager for Kharchovyk Velyka Bahachka.

== Other uses ==
Stadium was also used for volleyball competitions on two volleyball courts, 400 metres races, various state holiday celebrations and festivals.

== Sources ==
- Lomov, Anatolii; Kryvorotko, Serhii (2010), Энциклопедия Полтавского Футбола (1909-2010) [Encyclopedia of Poltava Football (1909-2010)] (in Russian), Poltava: OOO "ASMI", ISBN 978-966-182-118-6
- Starkov, Viktor (2018), Легендарный "Пищевик" Как это было... [The legendary "Kharchovyk" How it was...] (in Russian), Poltava: PP "Astraia"
