= FC Kharchovyk Velyka Bahachka =

Defunct football club based in Velyka Bahachka, Ukraine

Kharchovyk Velyka Bahachka
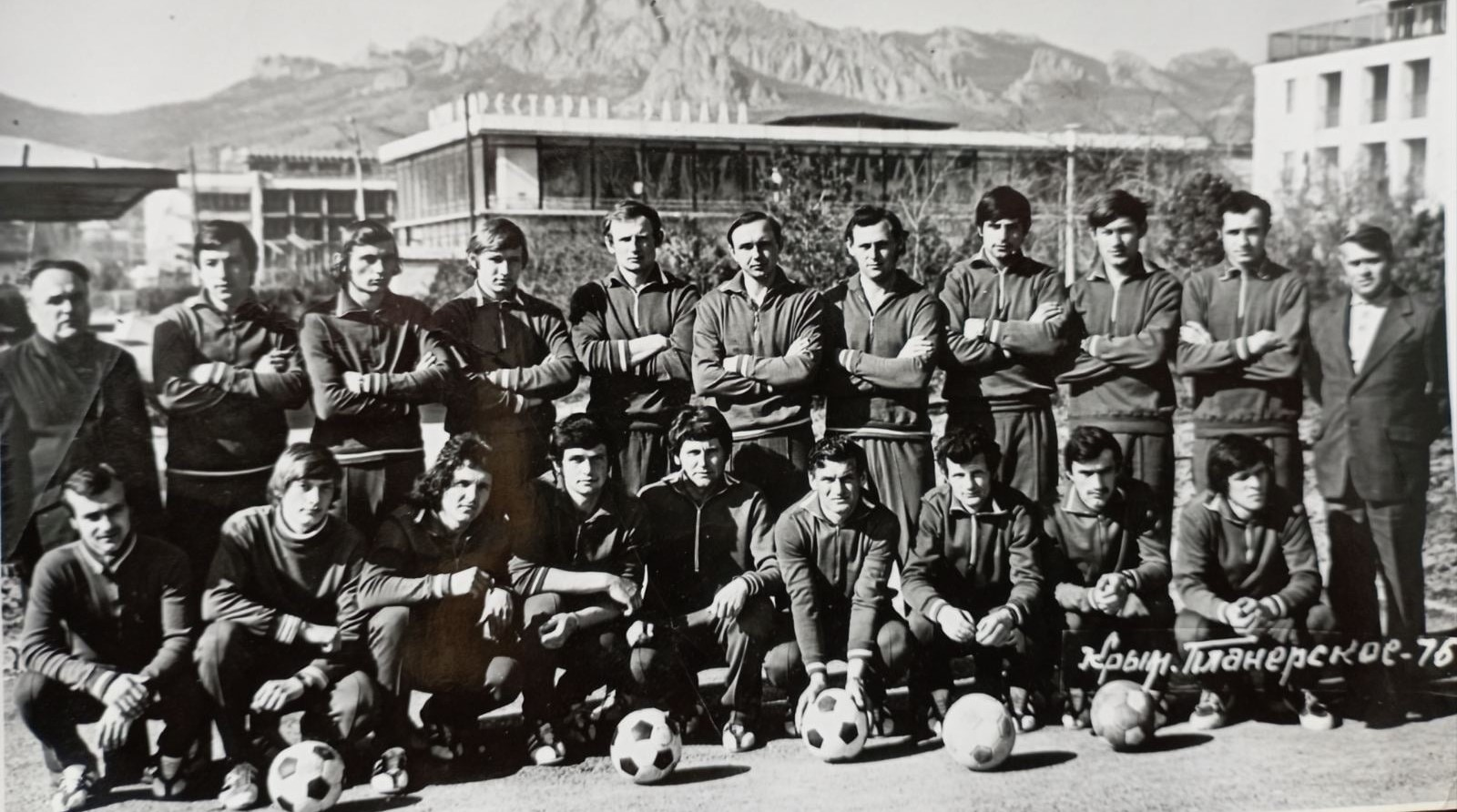
- Group photo showing members of FC Kharchovyk Velyka Bahachka
- Founded: 1952
- Dissolved: 1980s
- Ground: Kolos Stadium, Velyka Bahachka

Football Club Kharchovyk Velyka Bahachka (Ukrainian: ФК Харчовик Велика Багачка); was a Ukrainian Soviet football team based in Velyka Bahachka, Ukraine.

== History ==
Club was created in 1952 as part of the Kolhospnyk sports society under the name Kolhospnyk. In their first year they took part in Zone 3 of the Poltava Oblast championship. Team lost all six matches only earning points for a technical win and finishing seventh in their zone. Next year the club finished second in Zone 3 of the Second League of Poltava Oblast championship. They continued to play in Second League, winning their Zone in 1956. They advanced to the final tournament and finished third. The club remained in Second league until 1961 when they won their Zone 2 group and advanced to the final part. At home during three days, the club won the league title. In 1969 club began construction of their stadium, which was finished two years later. In 1970 the clubs name was changed to Kolos. In that year they took part in Third league and lost in the final of the Kolos sport society cup. Two years later they won the Third League and a year later they were promoted to first league. During 1972 they also won the Golden Kolos cup. During 1973 the club was named Kharchovyk and played in second league. In 1974 the club finished fifth in the First League. They won the Golden Kolos cup again in 1975 and finished fourth in the league. In 1976 the club again finished fourth in the championship. They also won the cup of the Ministry of Meat and Dairy Industry. In 1977 the club won bronze medals for finishing third in the championship. Club also won food industry silver medals. They repeated their achievement next year. They also reached the cup final for the first time. Kharchovyk lost 4–0 to Burevisnyk Poltava. During August the club took part in Ministry of Food Industry competition where they won silver medals. During 1979 the club finished fourth in their group and advanced to the final part where they finished last. Club also won Golden Kolos cup and food industry competition. Overall they played forty-eight matches and scored 121 goals. During 1980 the club finished in last place in championship and for the forth time won food industry silver medals. The club finished participation in Oblast championship and cup, continuing to play in industry competitions.

== Name change ==
- Kolhospnyk Velyka Bahachka (1952–1970)
- Kolos Velyka Bahachka (1970–1973)
- Kharchovyk Velyka Bahachka (1973–1980s)

== Honours ==
Poltava Oblast Championship

Runners-up (2): 1977, 1978

Poltava Oblast Cup

Runners-up (1): 1978

Poltava Oblast Championship Second League

Winners (1): 1961

Poltava Oblast Championship Third League

Winners (1): 1972

== Sources ==
- Pyrukhin, Yurii, Энциклопедия кременчугского футбола [Encyclopedia of Kremenchuk football] (in Russian), Kremenchuk
- Lomov, Anatolii; Stadnychenko, Oleksandr (2009), 100 Років Полтавському Футболу [100 Years of Poltava Football] (in Ukrainian), Poltava: Poltava, ISBN 978-966-97035-0-7
- Lomov, Anatolii; Kryvorotko, Serhii (2010), Энциклопедия Полтавского Футбола (1909-2010) [Encyclopedia of Poltava Football (1909-2010)] (in Russian), Poltava: OOO "ASMI", ISBN 978-966-182-118-6
