= Zinkiv Regiment =

Zinkiv Regiment Зіньківський полк
- Active: 1661–1671
- Country: Cossack Hetmanate
- Type: Cossack regiment
- Size: 12 sotnias
- Garrison/HQ: Zinkiv, Ukraine

The Zinkiv Regiment (Ukrainian: Зіньківський полк, romanized: Zinkivskyi polk) was one of the territorial-administrative subdivisions of the Cossack Hetmanate. The regiment's capital was the city of Zinkiv, now in Poltava Oblast of central Ukraine.

The Zinkiv Regiment was founded in 1661 on the territories of the disbanded Hadiach county out of the Poltava Regiment.

In 1671, the regiment was renamed Hadiach Regiment.

== Structure ==
The regiment comprised 12 sotnias:

- Birky
- Hadiach
- Hrun
- Komyshnia
- Kotelva
- Kovalivka
- Kuzemyn
- Liutenka
- Opishnia
- Rashivka
- Vepryk
- Zinkiv
