= Ostap Vyshnia =

Ukrainian writer and humourist

- Остап Вишня
- Born: Pavlo Mykhailovych Hubenko; 13 November 1889 near Hrun, Russian Empire (now Ukraine)
- Died: 28 September 1956 (aged 66); Kyiv, Soviet Union (now Ukraine)
- Citizenship: Russian Empire; Ukrainian People's Republic; Soviet Union
- Occupation: writer
- Writing career
- Period: 1919-1956
- Genres: humoresque, feuilleton

Pavlo Mykhailovych Hubenko (Note: , also spelled Gubenko) (Ukrainian: Павло Михайлович Губенко; 13 (O.S. 1) November 1889 – 28 September 1956), better known by the literary pseudonym of Ostap Vyshnia, was a Ukrainian writer, humourist, satirist, and medical official (feldsher). Compared by critics to Mark Twain, his fame was said to have competed in early Soviet Ukraine with only Taras Shevchenko and Vladimir Lenin.

== Biography ==
=== Early life ===
Pavlo Hubenko was born in a large peasant family of 17 children on 13 November 1889 in the khutir (farmstead) Chechva near the small town of Hrun, in Zinkiv uyezd, at the time in the Poltava Governorate of the Russian Empire. Today his place is in Sumy Oblast while Zinkiv is a city in Poltava Oblast, both in Ukraine. He studied in elementary school in Zinkiv, later enrolling into the Kyiv military-nursing school, which he finished in 1907.

After graduating, Hubenko worked as a nurse in the Army and then at the surgical department of the Southwestern Railway hospital. He finally managed to take the tests to enroll into the Kyiv University in 1917, but two years later dropped out was fully overtaken by journalism and literary work. During that time he also served as the chief of the medical-sanitary directorate of Ukrainian Ministry of Railways under the Directorate of Ukraine, and became known for his satirical phrase: Inside the wagon - Directory, under the wagon - territory.

=== Beginning of literary career ===
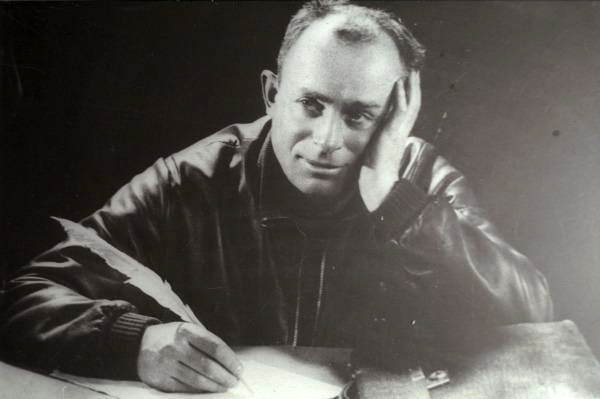
Ostap Vyshnia in 1925

Hubenko started his career as publicist after moving to Kamianets-Podilskyi along with the government of the Ukrainian People's Republic in 1919. His first published work, Denikin's Democratic Reforms, appeared on 2 November 1919 in the newspaper Narodna Volia under the pen name P. Hrunsky. Several satirical articles were also printed in this same newspaper by the young writer. Later that year, he was captured by Bolsheviks while serving in the Ukrainian Army and heavily sick with typhus.

In 1920 Hubenko was imprisoned in a Kharkiv prison, staying there until the end of the Civil War. He was freed in 1921 following an appeal by Vasyl Ellan-Blakytnyi. Hubenko's period of regular publication began in April 1921, when he became a journalist with the government newspaper News of the All-Ukrainian Central Executive Committee (Ukrainian: Вісті ВУЦВК). The pen name Ostap Vyshnia first appeared in The Peasant Truth on 22 July 1921, in the feuilleton Odd Fellow, Really!.

His popularity, especially among peasants, made Vyshnia one of the most published Ukrainian authors of the 1920s. During that time he also created several works for the theatre. Vyshnia eventually replaced Blakytnyi as editor of Chervonyi Perets magazine, but soon lost his enthusiasm for that kind of work.

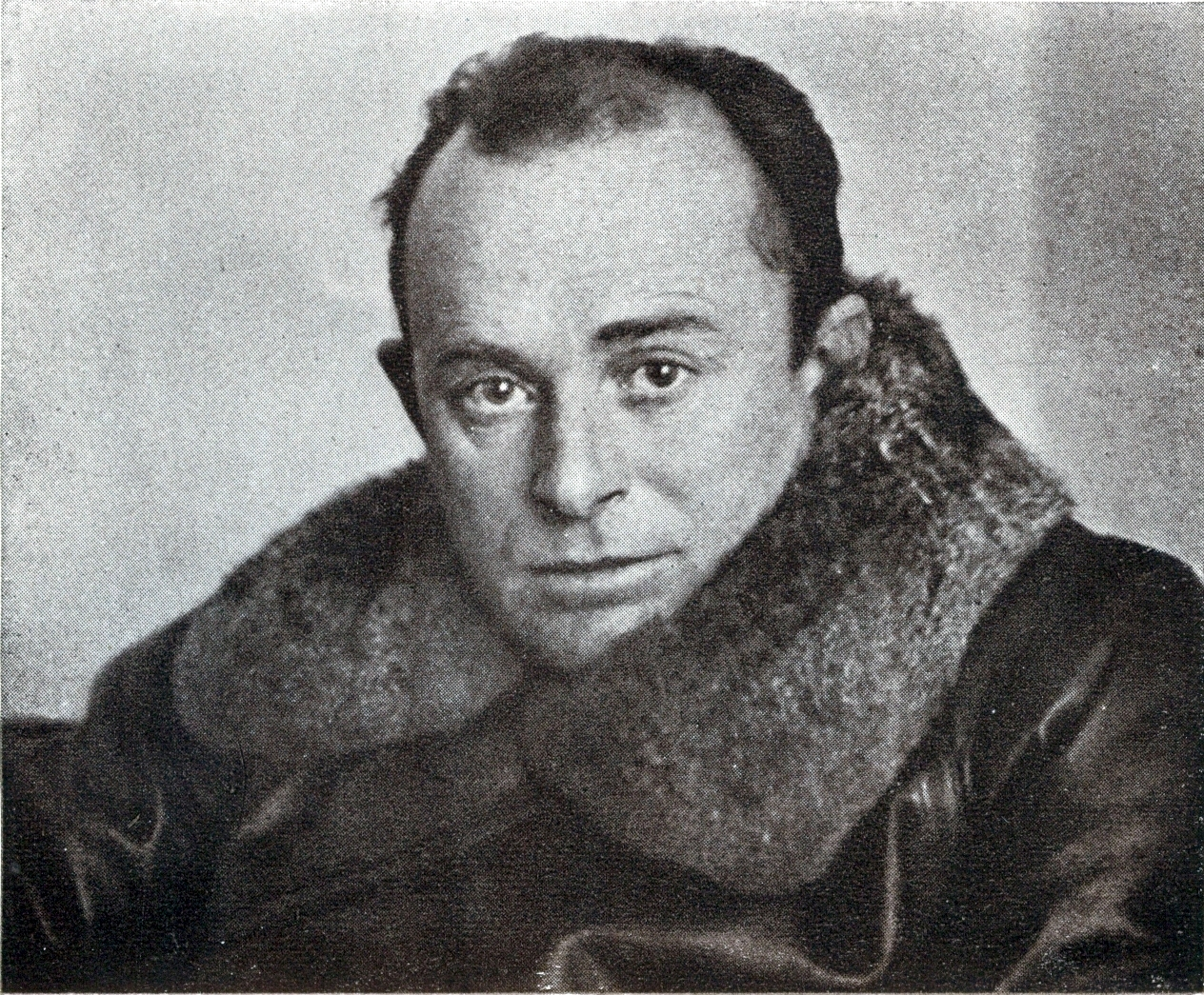
Ostap Vyshnia in 1928

=== Arrest and imprisonment ===
In 1933, he was sentenced to execution by firing squad following an accusation of counterrevolutionary activities, terrorism and alleged preparation of an attempt on life of Pavel Postyshev; that sentence was eventually commended to ten years in a forced labour camp. Vyshnia was one of the few representatives of the Renaissance group who evaded execution. Vyshnia spent the following decade imprisoned in various Gulag camps.

During imprisonment, he worked for some time as the editor of a camp newspaper in Ukhtpechlag, but was removed from that post after the assassination of Sergei Kirov. While in prison, Vyshnia suffered from a spinal fracture and survived a bout of pneumonia after having been forced to march on foot from Ukhta to Kozhva during freezing conditions in January 1935. Nevertheless, he continued to provide help to fellow prisoners, supplying them with medicaments and alcohol and overseeing the prison pharmacy.

=== Later life ===
Vyshnia was able to return to his literary career only after his liberation from prison in 1943. His later works followed the party line and were critical of Ukrainian nationalism. He also created a number of texts on war topics. He was rehabilitated in 1955.

Ostap Vyshnia died on 28 September 1956 in Kyiv. His funeral reportedly filled the Khreshchatyk street. He is buried at the Baikove Cemetery.

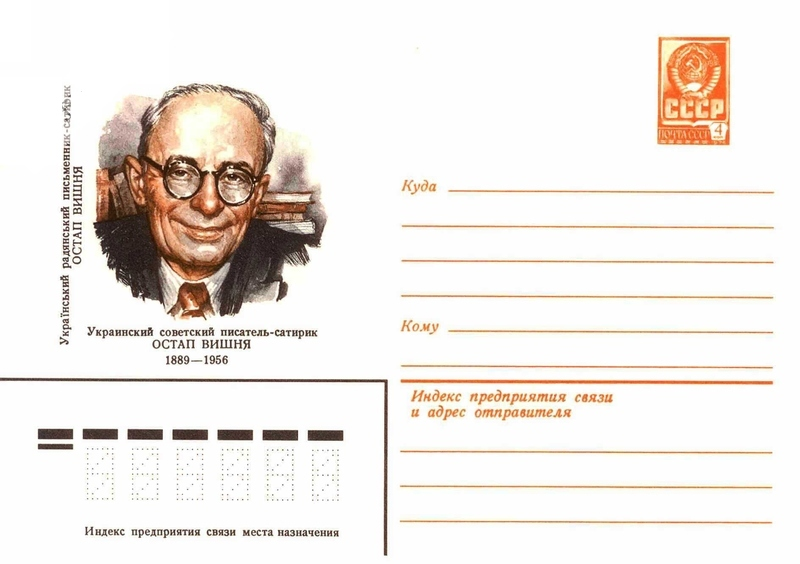
Soviet postal envelope of 1979 with portrait of Ostap Vyshnia

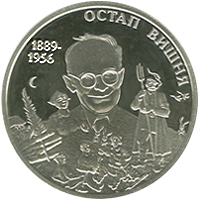
Ukrainian coin portraying Vyshnia

== Personal life and family ==
In his free time, Vyshnia enjoyed fishing and hunting. In years before his arrest, he resided at the Slovo Building in Kharkiv, having previously headed the cooperative tasked with its construction.

Vyshnia's elder brother Vasyl Chechvianskyi also worked as a humourist. He was executed on 15 July 1937 in Kyiv on accusations of harbouring intent to assassinate Ukrainian Communist leaders Pavel Postyshev and Stanislav Kosior. In 1990 Chechvianskyi's execution was recognized by Soviet authorities to have been unjustified. His place of burial remains unknown.

Vyshnia was married twice and had a son from his first marriage. His second wife, actress Varvara Vasylivna Masliuchenko, was exiled to an administrative settlement in Arkhangelsk Oblast with her underage daughter after having visited him in prison.

== Works ==
- Dila nebesni ("Heavenly Doings", 1923)
- Vyshnevi usmishky sil’s’ki ("Vyshnia's Rural Merriment", 1923)
- Komu vesele, a komu sumne ("For Some It's Funny, For Some It's Sad", 1924)
- Rep'iashky ("Little Burrs", 1924)
- Vyshnevi usmishky kryms’ki ("Vyshnia's Crimean Merriment", 1925)
- Lytsem do sela ("Facing the Village", 1926)
- Ukraïnizuiemos’ ("We Are Becoming Ukrainized", 1926)
- Vyshnevi usmishky literaturni ("Vyshnia's Literary Merriment", 1927)
- Vyshnevi usmishky teatral’ni ("Vyshnia's Theatrical Merriment", 1927)
- Allo na khvyli 477 ("Hello on Frequency 477", 1929) – revue produced at Berezil Theatre together with Maik Yohansen and Mykola Khvylyovy
- Vyshnevi usmishky zakordonni ("Vyshnia's Merriment from Abroad", 1930)
- Zenitka ("The Anti-Aircraft Gun", 1944)
- Samostiina dirka ("The Independent Little Hole", 1945)
- Vesna—krasna ("Spring is Beautiful", 1949)
- Mudrist’ kolhospna ("Collective-Farm Wisdom", 1952)
- A narod viiny ne khoche ("But the People Don't Want a War", 1953)
- Velyki rostit’ ("May You Prosper", 1955)

=== Translations ===
- Hard Times (translation into English of best humour & satire spanning his whole career, published 1981) – transl. by Yuri Tkacz, Bayda Books, Australia

== See also ==
- List of Ukrainian-language writers
- List of Ukrainian literature translated into English
