= Hrun, Okhtyrka Raion, Sumy Oblast =

Village in Sumy Oblast, Ukraine

Hrun Грунь
- Village
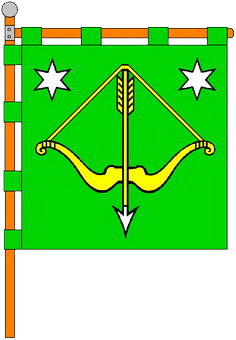
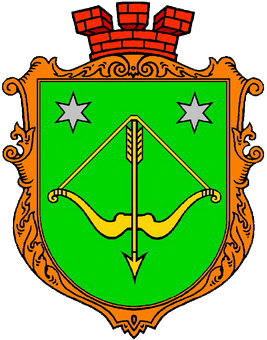
- Flag Coat of arms

- Location of Hrun in Sumy Oblast Location of Hrun in Ukraine
- Coordinates: 50°14′16″N 34°36′09″E
- Country: Ukraine
- Oblast: Sumy Oblast
- Raion: Okhtyrka Raion
- Hromada: Hrun rural hromada
- First mentioned: 1665

Population
  - Total: 2,220

Hrun (Ukrainian: Грунь) is a village in Okhtyrka Raion, in Ukraine's central Sumy Oblast. It is the administrative centre of Hrun rural hromada, one of the hromadas of Ukraine. Its population is 2,220 (as of 2024).

== History ==
Hrun was first mentioned in 1665. Under the Cossack Hetmanate it was the capital of the Hrun Sotnia, part of the Hadiach Regiment.

The village was taken over by the Russian Soviet Federative Socialist Republic in December 1917. An Association for Joint Cultivation of Land named Zghoda was also established in the village in 1924. During World War II 295 residents of Hrun were killed.

Until 1959 Hrun was the centre of Hrun Raion. After the raion was abolished, the village became part of Okhtyrka Raion.

== Notable people ==
- Hryhorii Buhaienko, Ukrainian Soviet physicist.
- Oleksii Cherniavskyi, People's Deputy of Ukraine.
- Andrey Dekhtyarenko, Hero of the Soviet Union.
- Lavr Diachenko, Ukrainian poet.
- Anatolo Koch, Ukrainian Esperantist.
- Ivan Kyias, Ukrainian Soviet miner.
- Anastasiya Leshchenko, Soviet biologist.
- Andrii Saiko, Ukrainian educator.
- Heorhii Sakhnovskyi, Ukrainian Soviet politician.
- Wellboy, Ukrainian pop singer.
- Ostap Vyshnya, Ukrainian humourist (born near Hrun)
