= Velyka Bahachka =

Rural locality in Poltava Oblast, Ukraine

Velyka Bahachka Велика Багачка
- Rural settlement
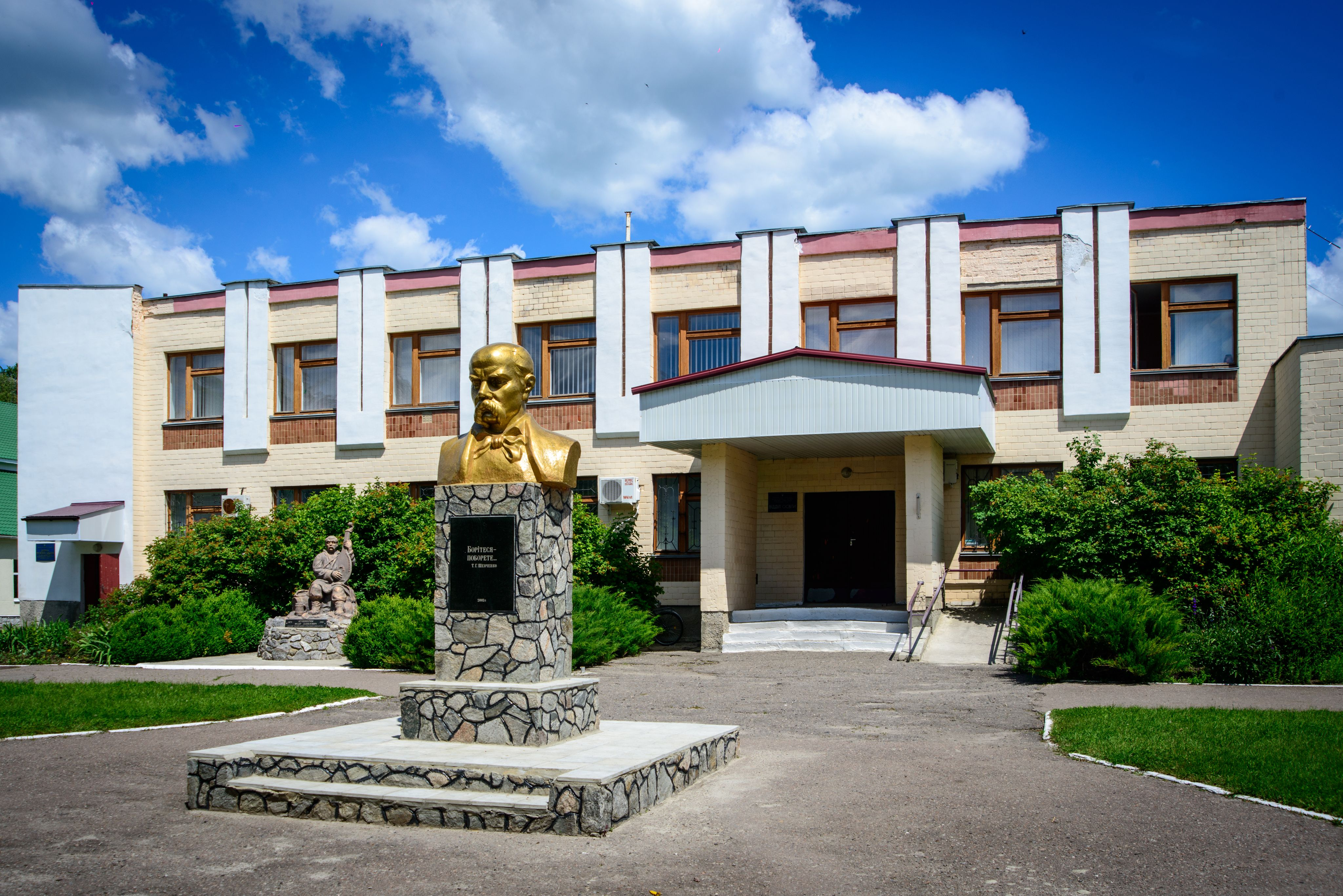

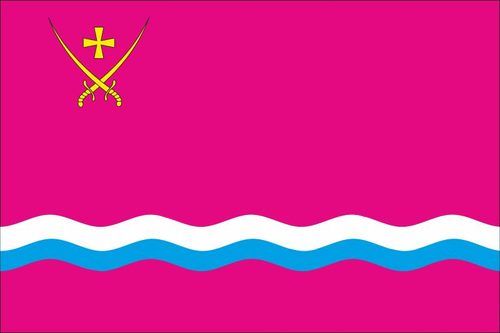
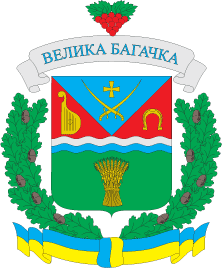
- Flag Coat of arms

- Location in Poltava Oblast Location in Ukraine
- Country: Ukraine
- Oblast: Poltava Oblast
- Raion: Myrhorod Raion

Population (2022)
  - Total: 5,261
- Time zone: UTC+2 (EET)
  - Summer (DST): UTC+3 (EEST)

Velyka Bahachka (Ukrainian: Велика Багачка, Russian: Великая Багачка) is a rural settlement in Poltava Oblast in Ukraine. It was formerly the administrative center of Velyka Bahachka Raion, but now administered within Myrhorod Raion. It is located on the Psel, a left tributary of the Dnieper. Population: 5,261 (2022 estimate).

== History ==
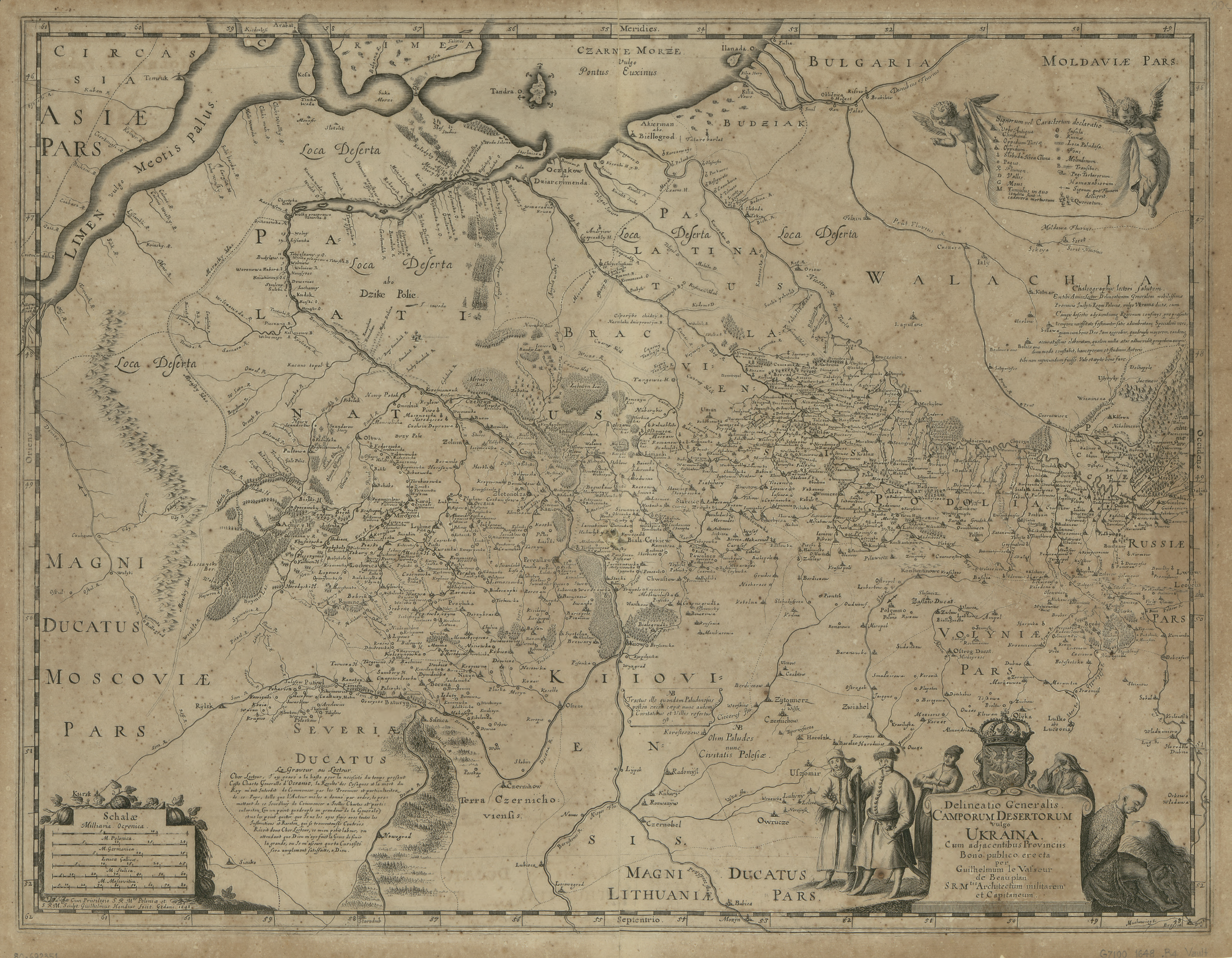
The first mentions of the settlement appeared at the end of the 16th - at the beginning of the 17th century. On Guillaume Levasseur de Beauplan's map, created in the 17th century, it is marked as Bohak. (Note: See map Polish Ukraine and wider region, 1648 map by Beauplan; south is at the top) The settlement arose as a result of Cossack colonization.

Until 26 January 2024, Velyka Bahachka was designated urban-type settlement. On this day, a new law entered into force which abolished this status, and Velyka Bahachka became a rural settlement.

== Economy ==
=== Transportation ===
The settlement has access to Highway M03 connecting Kyiv and Kharkiv via Poltava. It also has road access to Myrhorod.

The closest railway station, Yareski, about 10 kilometres (6.2 mi) northeast of Velyka Bahachka and on the railway line connecting Poltava and Romodan via Myrhorod. There is both local and long-distance passenger traffic.
