= Zinkiv, Poltava Oblast =

City in Poltava Oblast, Ukraine

Zinkiv Зіньків
- City
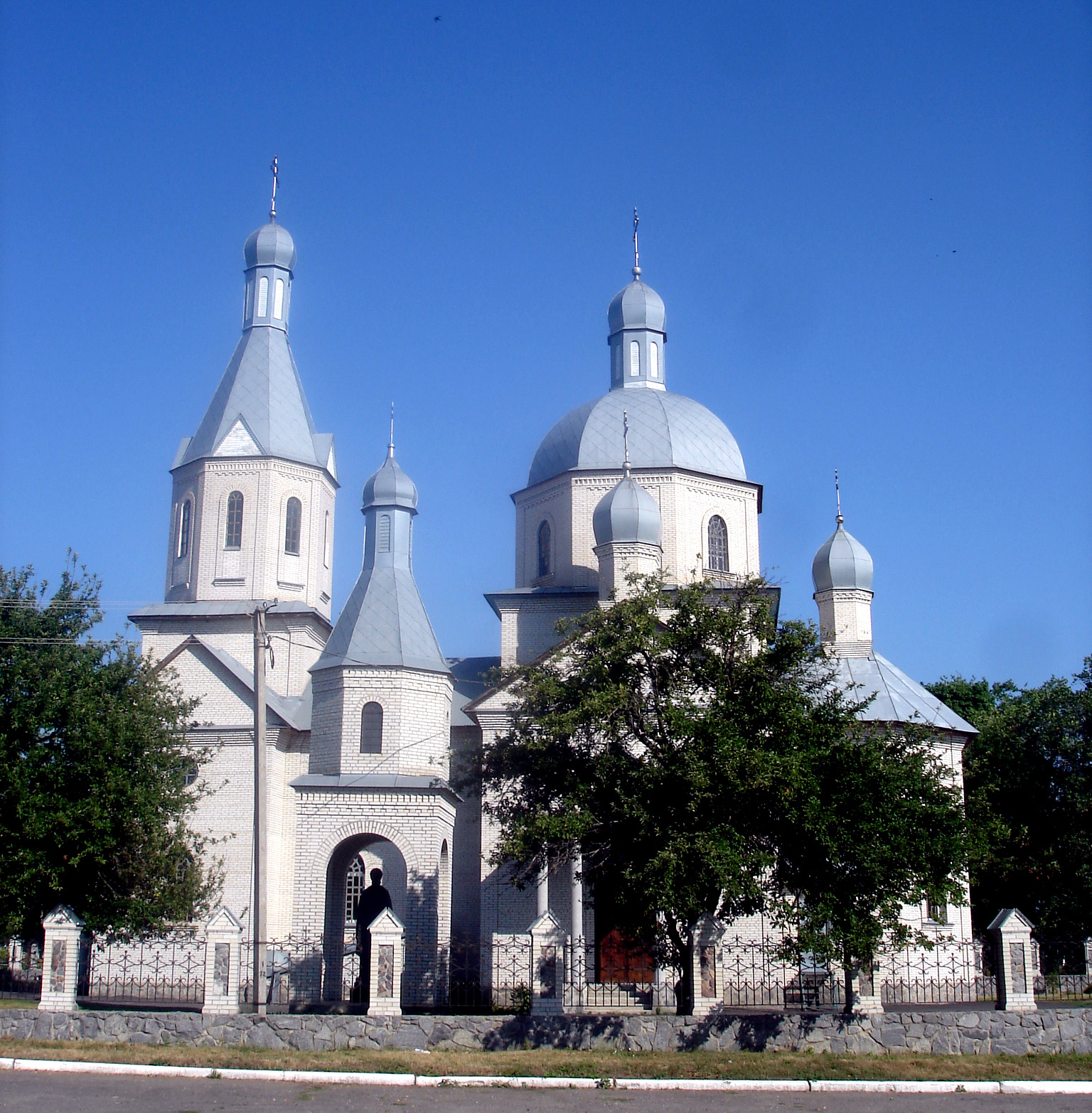
- Nativity Church in Zinkiv

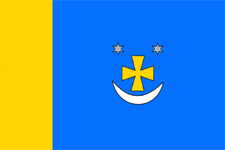
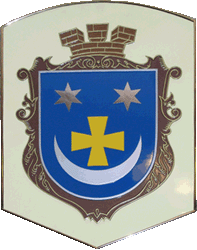
- Flag Coat of arms
- Interactive map of Zinkiv
- Location of Zinkiv within the Poltava Oblast Zinkiv (Ukraine)
- Coordinates: 50°12′37″N 34°21′29″E
- Country: Ukraine
- Oblast: Poltava Oblast
- Raion: Poltava Raion
- Hromada: Zinkiv urban hromada
- Elevation: 132 m (433 ft)

Population (2022)
  - Total: 9,168
  - Density: 1,400/km^{2} (3,600/sq mi)
- Time zone: UTC+2 (EET)
  - Summer (DST): UTC+3 (EEST)
- Postal code: 36000—36499
- Area code: +380

Zinkiv (Ukrainian: Зіньків, pronounced [z⁽ʲ⁾inʲˈkiu̯]; Russian: Зиньков, romanized: Zin'kov) is a city in the Poltava Oblast of central Ukraine. Previously the administrative center of Zinkiv Raion, since 2020 it has been part of Poltava Raion. It hosts the administration of Zinkiv urban hromada, one of the hromadas of Ukraine. The city's estimated population in 2022 was 9,168,, increasing to 10,140 in 2024.

== History ==
Zinkiv was first mentioned in 1604 as a fortress subordinate to the Polish–Lithuanian Commonwealth.

During the Cossack uprising of 1648–1657 led by Bohdan Khmelnytsky, it belonged to the Poltava Regiment as a sotnia town.

From 1661 (1662) to 1671 (1672), it served as the center of the Zinkiv Regiment.

From the late 17th century until the abolition of the Cossack administrative system in 1782, Zinkiv was part of the Hadiach Regiment.

In 1768, the residents of Zinkiv took an active part in the Haidamak movement.

In 1781, after the liquidation of the regimental system, Zinkiv became a county town of the Chernihiv viceroyalty. It received municipal status, a charter, a coat of arms, and an official seal.

In 1783, Zinkiv had a population of 7,212 residents, including 3,596 men and 3,616 women.

Beginning in 1796, Zinkiv belonged to the Little Russia Governorate, and starting in 1802, to the Poltava Governorate.

In the first half of the 19th century, the population increased significantly. While in 1805 the town had 6,707 residents, by 1862 the population reached 9,810, including 5,117 men and 4,693 women.

According to 1859 data, the town had 9,120 inhabitants (4,742 men and 4,378 women), 1,604 households, 9 Orthodox churches, a Jewish synagogue, a hospital, county and parish schools, and a postal station. Five annual fairs and regular markets were held.[3]

As of 1891, Zinkiv had a population of 9,377 residents, including 4,590 men and 4,787 women; Jews accounted for 9.4%. By 1897, the population had grown to 10,443, with the following ethnic composition: 85.8% Ukrainians, 12.1% Jews, and 1.8% Russians.

In 1912, a boys’ school opened in Zinkiv, and in 1915 a girls’ school followed.

Soviet occupation of Zinkiv began in January 1918. At that time, the population was 10,905. In 1924, the commune Iskra Lenina was organized; by 1930 it included 320 people. In the spring of 1931, forced collectivization was carried out across 12 agricultural cooperatives, incorporating 850 peasant households.

Zinkiv served as a district center in 1923–1930 and again from 1932. Beginning in 1932, the district belonged to Kharkiv Oblast, and from 1937 to Poltava Oblast.

A total of 204 residents of Zinkiv died during the Holodomor of 1932–1933.[4]

During the German occupation in the course of the German–Soviet phase of World War II, from 9 October 1941 to 6 September 1943, a partisan group of 13 members operated in the town.

As of 1991, the territory of the Zinkiv City Council hosted two collective farms specializing in pork production and the raising of young cattle. The area also had inter-farm feed and canning factories, an agricultural chemical station, a branch of the Poltava Electromechanical Plant, a household and municipal services complex, and consumer cooperative facilities.[5]

During the European Revolution of 2014, the monument to Lenin in Zinkiv was dismantled at the end of February (removed on 24 February).[6]

== Geography ==
Zinkiv is located the northern part of Poltava Raion, 80 km from the regional center (Poltava). It stands on the Hrun-Tashan, in the geographical region of Dnieper Lowland, on the left bank of the Dnieper Valley.

Zinkiv is located in the basin of the Psel River, a left tributary of the Dnieper. The city is located in the forest steppe nature zone. Near the city there are broad-leaved forests and meadow vegetation of the river floodplain.

The climate of the Zinkiv is temperate continental. The average temperature in January is −6.0 °C, in July it is +20.0 °C, the amount of precipitation is 480–580 mm/year, which falls mainly in the summer as rain.

Regional highways pass through the city. The city has no railway connection, the nearest railway stations are in Hadyach and Poltava, at a distance of 36 km from Zinkiv.

== Population ==
Historical populations
Year	Pop.	±%
1783	7,212	—
1805	6,707	−7.0%
1859	9,120	+36.0%
1862	9,810	+7.6%
1891	9,377	−4.4%
1897	10,443	+11.4%
1918	10,905	+4.4%
1926	10,900	−0.0%
2001	10,393	−4.7%
2022	9,168	−11.8%
2024	10,140	+10.6%

=== Ethnicity ===
Distribution of the population by ethnicity according to the 2001 census:

Ethnic groups in Zinkiv
	percent
Ukrainians	96.28%
Russians	2.93%
Belarusians	0.34%
Armenians	0.19%
others	0.26%

=== Language ===
Distribution of the population by native language according to the 2001 census:

Language	Percentage
Ukrainian	96.83%
Russian	2.89%
other/undecided	0.28%

== Economy: Industry and Transport ==
Given that the Zinkiv region is predominantly agricultural, the industrial sector and most enterprises in the district center are largely connected to agriculture. The area also hosts several energy-related facilities due to the presence of the Solokhivske and, partly, the Bilske and Opishnia oil and gas condensate fields.

The main industrial and processing enterprises in Zinkiv include:

- the Zinkiv Brick Factory,
- the Zinkiv Compound Feed Plant,
- the Zinkiv branch of PJSC Poltavaoblenergo,
- and the Zinkiv Gas Utilities Operation Department of PJSC Poltavagaz.

Zinkiv is also home to Communication Center No. 1 of the Poltava Directorate of PJSC Ukrtelecom.

The city has bus connections, with an operating bus station, to Kyiv, Kharkiv, Poltava, Sumy, and Kremenchuk.

== Social services: healthcare, education, and culture ==
The main medical institution of the city and district is the Zinkiv Central District Hospital.

The city's educational system includes several general secondary schools:

- Zinkiv Specialized School No. 1 (Sobornosti Street 62),
- Zinkiv Lyceum named after Mykola Zerov (Vozdvyzhenska Street 20),
- Zinkiv Specialized School No. 3 (H. Severyna Street 1).

Vocational education in Zinkiv is provided by:

- Zinkiv Vocational Agrarian Lyceum (Pohribniaka Street 52)
- State Vocational School No. 25 (Vozdvyzhenska Street 82).
- City also hosts a children's music school.

Zinkiv has several extracurricular and cultural institutions, including:

- Zinkiv Youth Technical Station (Pohribniaka Street 24),
- Municipal Specialized Children’s and Youth Sports School of the Olympic Reserve (Vozdvyzhenska Street 22),
- House of Children’s and Youth Creativity (Pershotravneva Street 30),
- Zinkiv Children’s Music School.

The Zinkiv Children’s Residential Care Home (Sobornosti Street 91) also operates in the city.

The main cultural institution of Zinkiv and the district is the District House of Culture. Since 1967, an important center for preserving and promoting local history has been the Zinkiv District Folk History Museum (Vozdvyzhenska Street 42). The museum contains 18 sections and approximately 4,000 exhibits illustrating the history of the region from ancient times to the present. Its collection includes items from archaeological excavations of an 8th–13th-century settlement in the village of Hlynske, as well as photographs, documents, and personal belongings of local residents who participated in World War II. The museum also covers the lives and work of notable figures in science and literature associated with the area.

The cultural needs of residents are served by several libraries, including the district library. Local print media are represented by the newspaper Holos Zinkivshchyny, published by the Zinkiv District Council and the District State Administration.

The Territorial Center for Social Services of the Zinkiv District provides medical, socio-economic, household, and informational support to pensioners and people with disabilities. It operates at Drozdivska Street 117 and 125 in Zinkiv.

== Architecture ==
In the center of Zinkiv, particularly along the main Vozdvyzhenska Street, a number of architecturally notable public and residential buildings dating from the late 19th to early 20th centuries have been preserved, including structures featuring elements of Art Nouveau. The most prominent among them is considered to be the Vozdvyzhenko House (1897).

In the Soviet era, several standard public buildings were constructed in the city, including the local government building (now the district state administration), the district House of Culture, the communications center, and the bus station.

Since Ukraine gained independence in 1991, new construction in Zinkiv has included the Church of the Nativity of Christ.

Zinkiv's urban sculpture includes several monuments erected during the Soviet period, such as the monument to Vladimir Lenin (1978, sculptor O. Oliinyk, architects V. and H. Klein; dismantled in 2014), a memorial dedicated to Soviet soldiers-liberators (1971), the grave of Hero of the Soviet Union M. K. Sarancha (1961), and the grave and monument to Sasha Sarancha (1982). In the years of independent Ukraine, a commemorative stele marking the 400th anniversary of Zinkiv was installed in 2004.

== Gallery ==
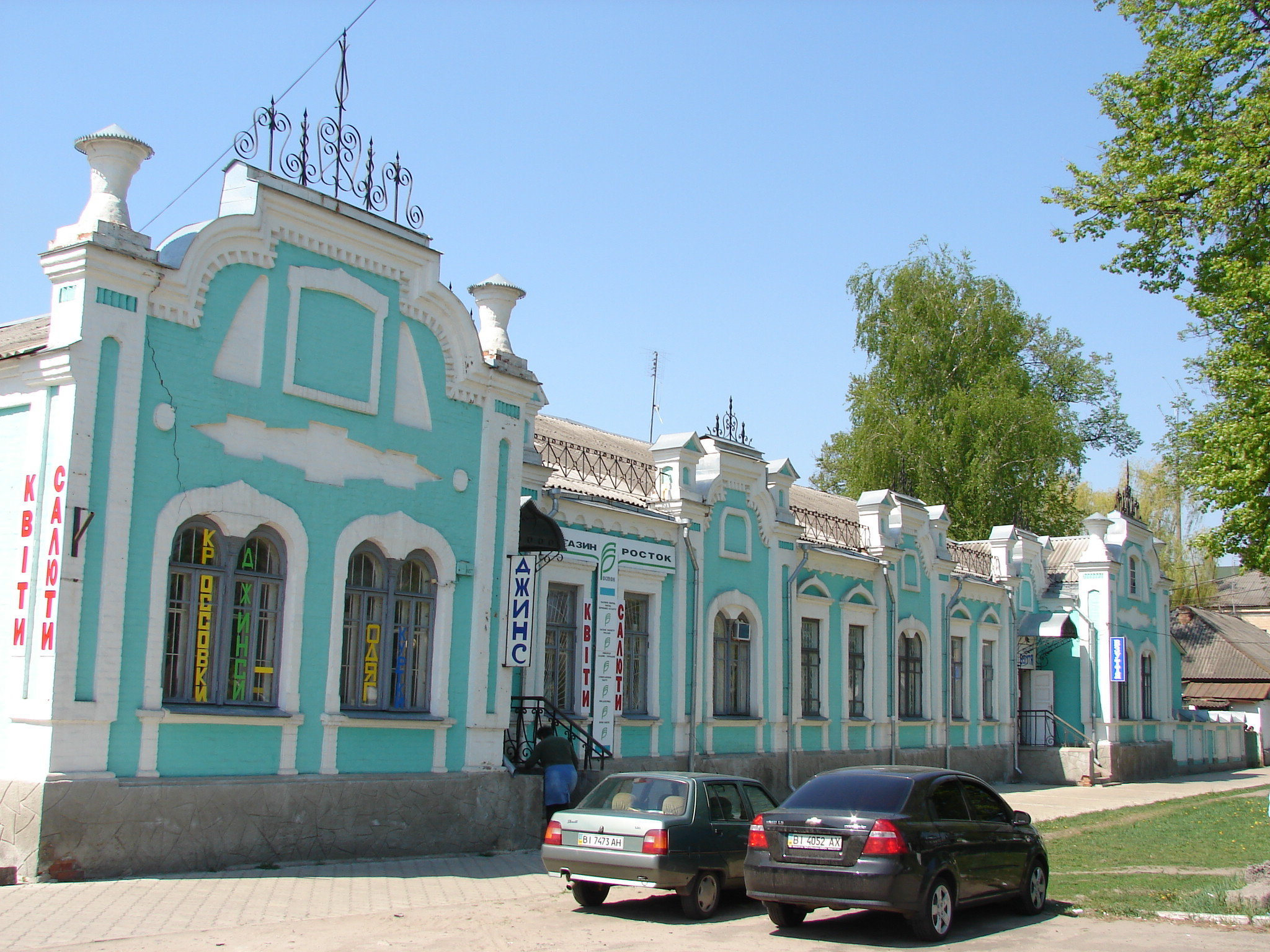
Modern architecture in Zinkiv

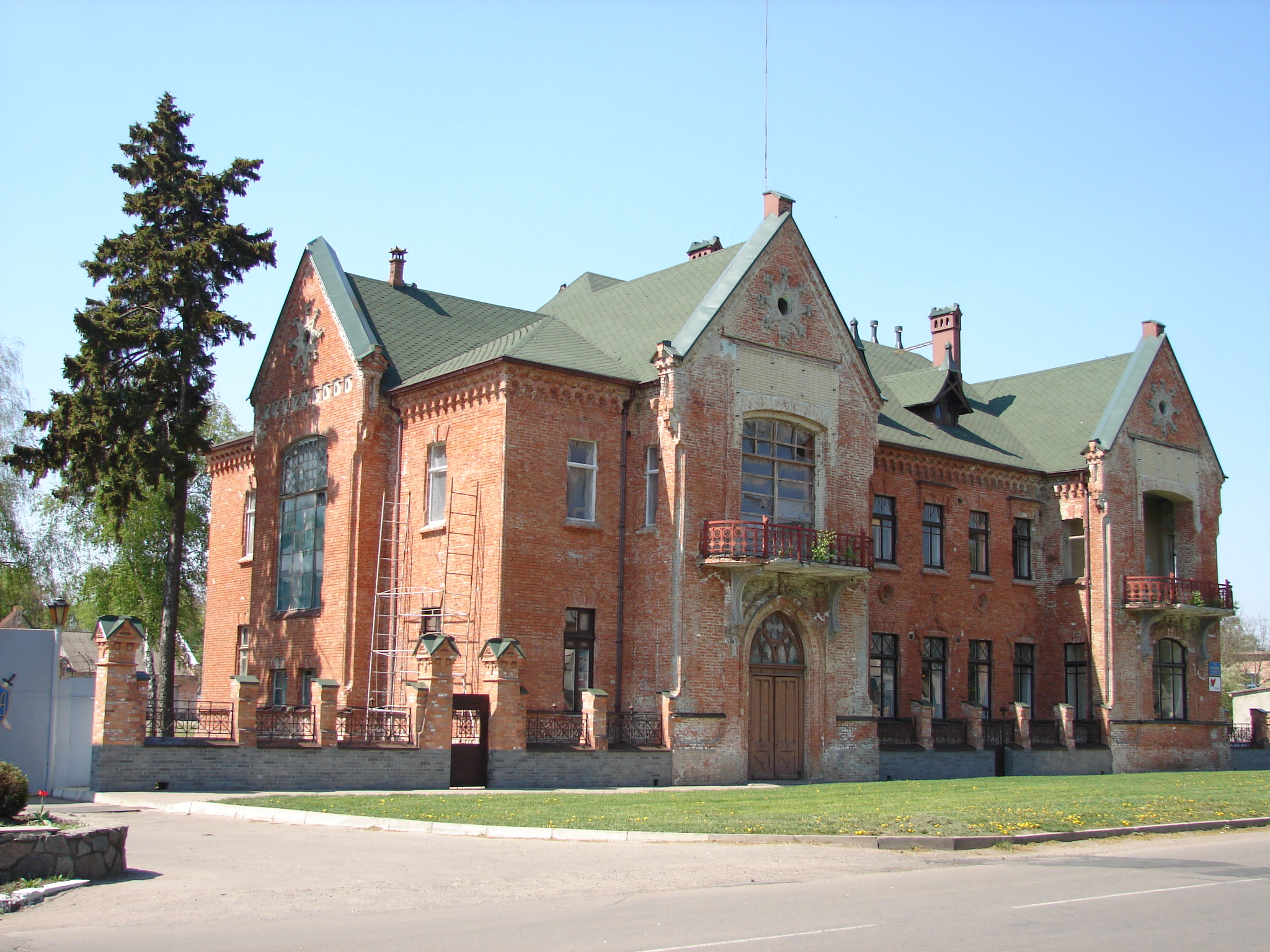
Neo-gothic bank building

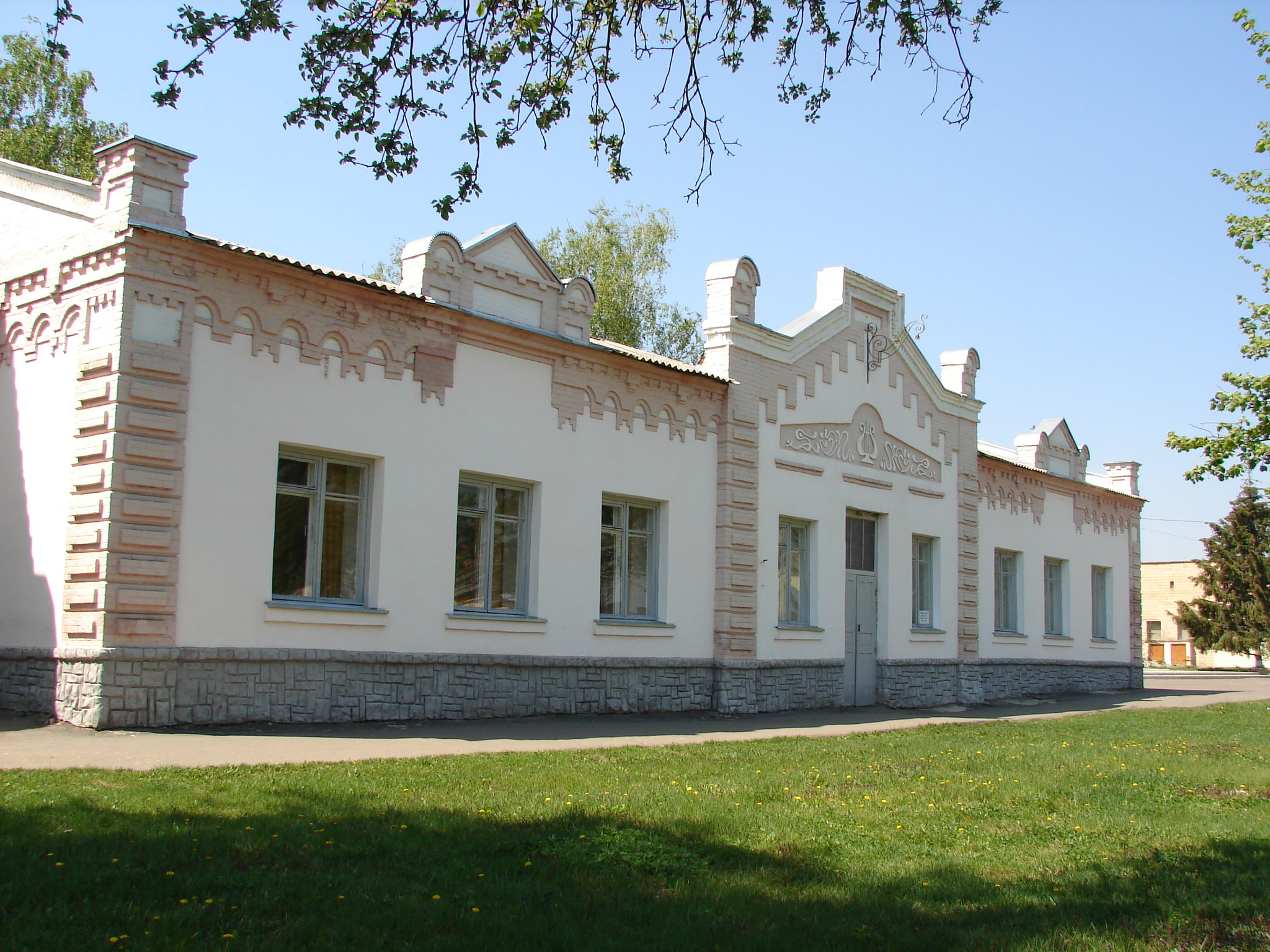
History museum

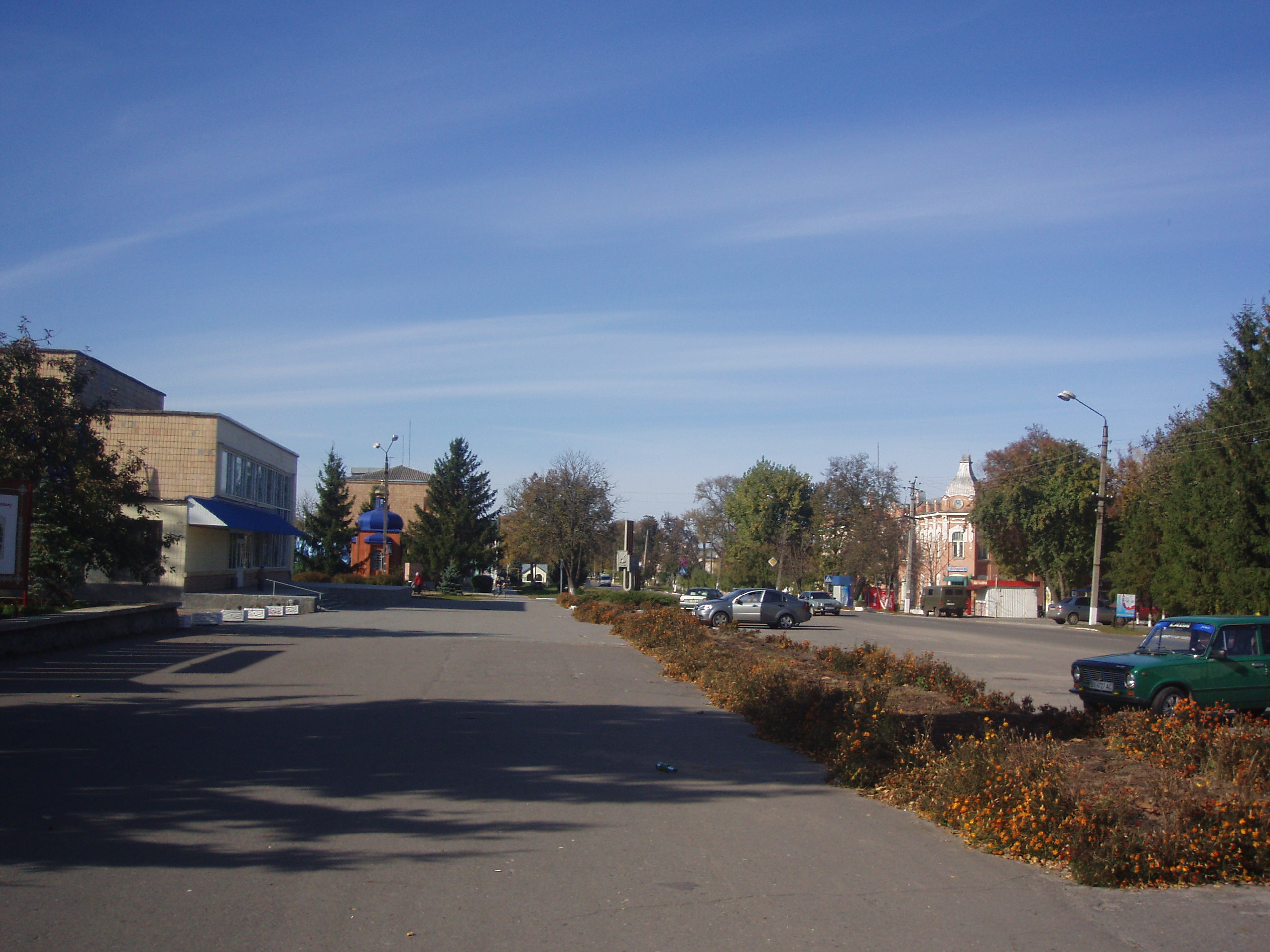
Downtown Zinkiv
