= Perets' =

Ukrainian satirical magazine

Perets' (Ukrainian: Перець, pronounced [ˈpɛretsʲ], lit. 'Pepper') is a Ukrainian satirical and humorous illustrated magazine. Together with the Moscow Krokodil (circulation 5 million copies in 1986), Perets' (circulation 3.3 million copies in 1986) was one of the two most popular comedy magazines in the USSR. Since December 2019, only the online version of the magazine has been available.

== History ==
=== Chervonyi Perets' ===
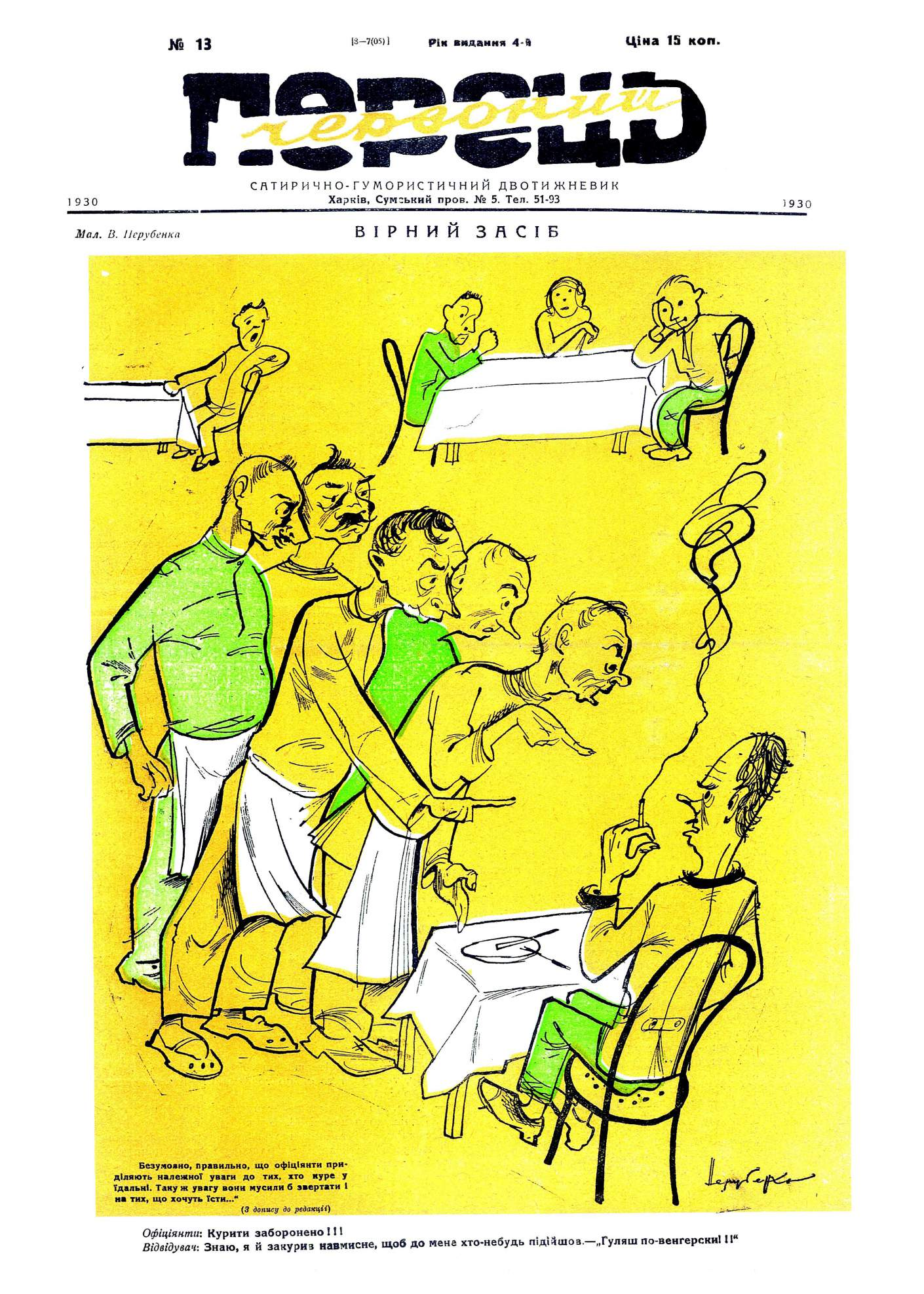
Cover of Red Pepper No. 13, 1930

The magazine was founded in the then capital of the Ukrainian SSR, Kharkiv, as Chervonyi Perets' (Червоний Перець, Red Pepper) in 1927. It moved to Kyiv in 1941. Literary critics associate the development of satire and humor in the first years after 1917 with two factors: the artistic creativity of the masses, called by the revolution to active social construction, and the satirical, mostly political and agitation speeches of Mayakovsky and Demyan Bedny. Ukrainian humor was evaluated as a motivating example. Satirical poems, humoresque, and fables directed against the White Guard and the foreign counterrevolution were published in the pages of the Red Army and civilian newspapers. At the same time, satirical publications imbued with anti-Bolshevik and anti-interventionist pathos appeared in the press of the opposite camp, testifying to the hopes of the part of the masses that associated the social liberation and national revival of Ukraine with the building of an independent Ukraine. In the science of literature, this array of satire and humor, except for a few studies, was mostly not taken into account by researchers and not studied.

The first two issues of the Perets' magazine were published in Kharkiv in 1922. Ostap Vyshnya took part in the organization and editing of the magazine together with Vasyl Ellan-Blakytny. Unfortunately, due to economic difficulties, the third issue did not come out.

The magazine was restored as a biweekly called Chervonyi Perets', published in Ukrainian in 1927–1934 in Kharkiv as a supplement to the News of the All-Ukrainian Central Executive Committee (editor: Vasyl Chechvyansky; circulation: 27,150 copies).

The magazine directed its efforts against bureaucracy and speculation, and introduced a rubric dedicated to complaints sent by readers. Almost the whole editorial board of the publication was executed during the 1930s Stalinist repressions.

=== Perets' ===
The magazine was revived under its modern name in Kyiv during the 1940s. The publication was allowed to ridicule some elements of Soviet life, although it was still limited in this by authorities. It also satirized the policies of Soviet Union's opponents, such as the US

The magazine's circulation reached the number of 3.000.000 in the late 1970s when it was close to rivaling the now-defunct Moscow-based Russian-language magazine Krokodil. At its peak in 1986 Perets' issued 3,3 million copies and was one of the most popular Soviet humour magazines.

In independent Ukraine the circulation of the magazine fell to around 13.000 copies. In December 2013 the magazine was deprived of state financing by authorities of Viktor Yanukovych and ceased its publications in early 2014. However, in 2017 it was revived by volunteers and started to be spread on subscription by post. Because of the rise in printing expenses and Ukrposhta's refusal to deliver the magazine to remote villages, starting from January 2020 the magazine transferred its publication to a fully electronic format.

== Employees ==
Ostap Vyshnya, Yuriy Vukhnal (Ivan Kovtun), Yukhym Gedz (Oleksa Savitsky), Antosha Ko (A. Gak), B. Simantsiv, K. Kotko (M. Lyubchenko) and others. The great popularity of the magazine was ensured by Ostap Vyshnya, who, according to some literary critics, was the most popular writer after Taras Shevchenko.

=== Illustrators ===
O. Khvostenko-Khvostov, O. Dovzhenko, A. Petrytsky, K. Agnit, O. Kozyurenko, L. Kaplan and others.
