= Zinkiv Raion =

Former subdivision of Poltava Oblast, Ukraine

Zinkiv Raion Зіньківський район
- Raion
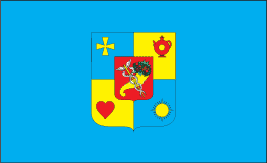
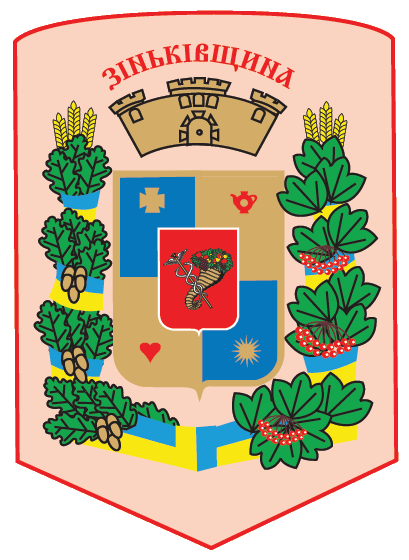
- Flag Coat of arms

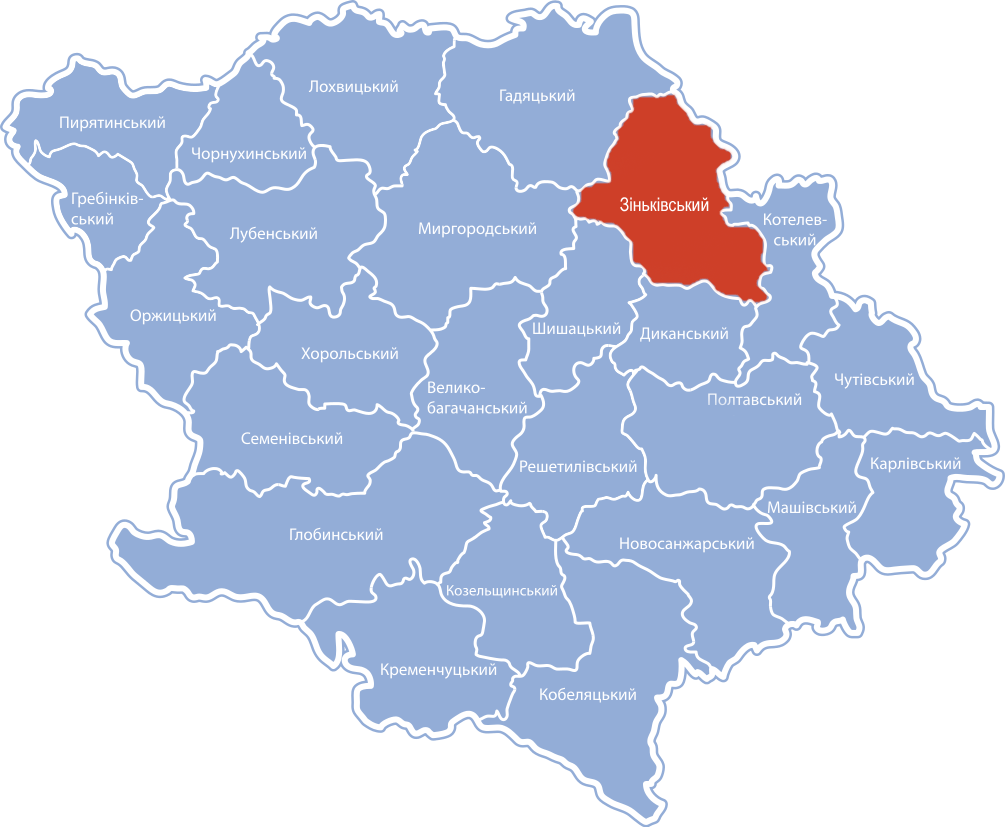
- Country: Ukraine
- Oblast: Poltava Oblast
- Established: 7 March 1923
- Disestablished: 18 July 2020
- Admin. center: Zinkiv
- Subdivisions: List: — city councils; — settlement councils; — rural councils; Number of localities: — cities; — urban-type settlements; 113 — villages; — rural settlements

Government
  - Governor: Oleksandr Tereshenko

Area
  - Total: 1,360 km^{2} (530 sq mi)

Population (2020)
  - Total: 32,763
  - Density: 24.1/km^{2} (62.4/sq mi)
- Time zone: UTC+02:00 (EET)
  - Summer (DST): UTC+03:00 (EEST)
- Postal index: Поштові індекси:
- Area code: +380-5353
- Website: Official homepage

Zinkiv Raion (Ukrainian: Зіньківський район) was a raion (district) in Poltava Oblast of central Ukraine. The raion's administrative center was the city of Zinkiv. The raion was abolished and its territory was merged into Poltava Raion on 18 July 2020 as part of the administrative reform of Ukraine, which reduced the number of raions of Poltava Oblast to four. The last estimate of the raion population was 32,763 (2020 est.)
