= Hadiach Regiment =

Hadiach Regiment Гадяцький полк
- Hadyach coat of arms
- Active: 1648 - 1782
- Country: Cossack Hetmanate
- Type: Cossack Regiment
- Size: 9 - 18 sotnias
- Garrison/HQ: Hadiach, Ukraine
- Engagements: Azov campaigns Great Northern War 1700-1704; Battle of Poltava; Russo-Turkish War (1735–1739)

Commanders
- Notable commanders: Yarema Khmelenko; Kindrat Burlii

Hadiach Regiment Гадяцький полк (Ukrainian)
- Regiment of Cossack Hetmanate
- 1648–1782
- Coat of arms

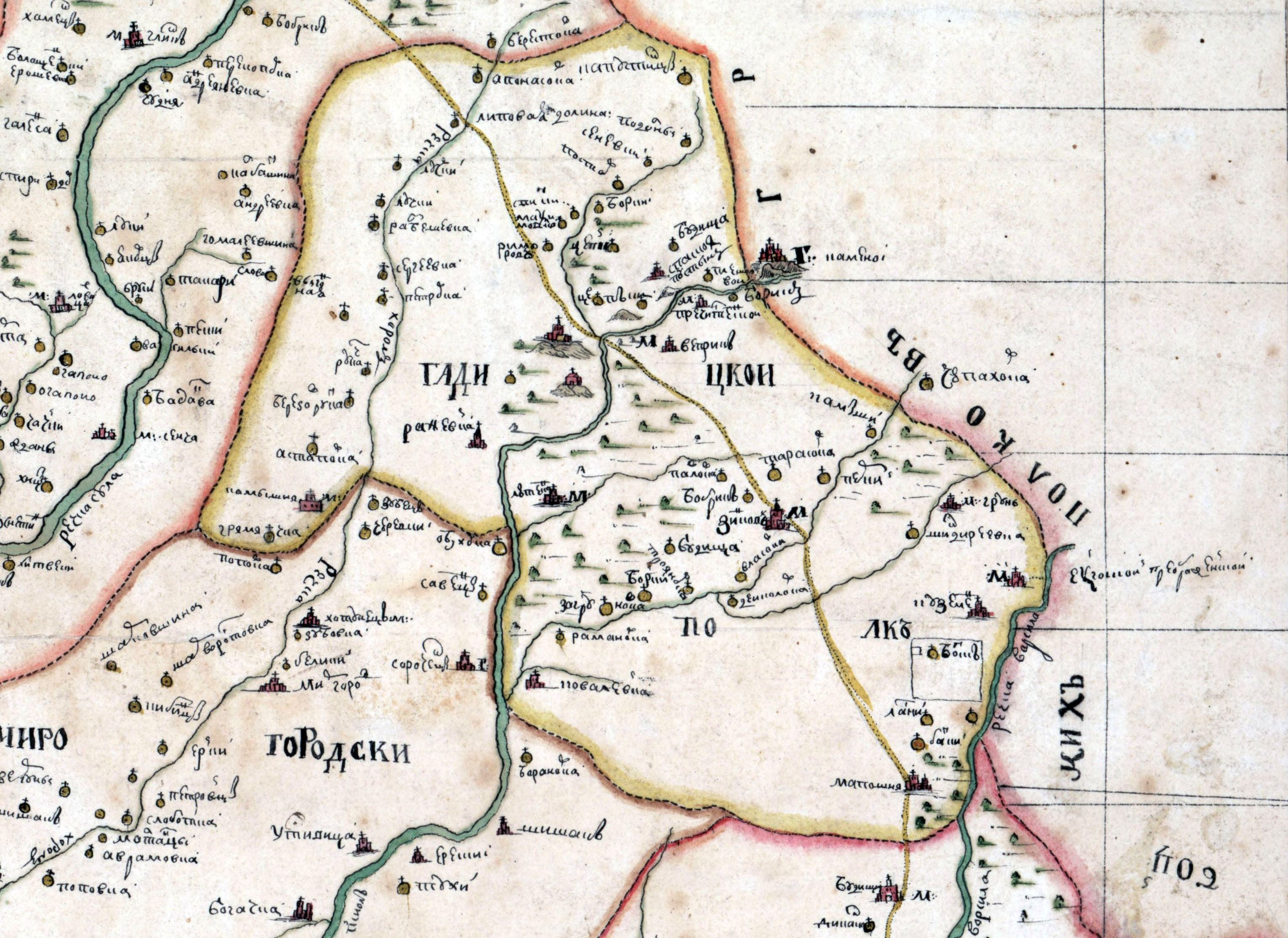
- Map of the Hadiach Regiment from mid-18th century
- Capital: Hadiach
- History
  - Khmelnytsky Uprising: 1648
  - Creation of Chernigov Viceroyalty: 1782
| Preceded by | Succeeded by |
| Kiev Voivodeship | Poltava Governorate |
- Today part of: Ukraine

The Hadiach Regiment (Ukrainian: Гадяцький полк, romanized: Hadiatskyi polk) was one of then territorial-administrative subdivisions of the Cossack Hetmanate. The regiment's capital was the city of Hadiach, now in Poltava Oblast of central Ukraine.

The Hadiach Regiment was founded in 1648. In 1649 the regiment became part of Poltava Regiment.

Under the hetman Ivan Briukhovetsky, Hadiach county became a new Zinkivskyi Regiment.

During the early years of the 1670s the Regiment was renamed Hadiach Regiment. During different years of its existence the regiment was composed of 9 to 18 sotnias. The regiment also had Cossack artillery. On the territories of the regiment were 11 cities and 971 villages.

In 1782 the regiment was disbanded by the order of Empress Catherine II. All of the regiment's territories were included into the Chernigov Viceroyalty.

== Structure ==
In 1782 there were 18 sotnias in the regiment:

- Hadiach (3)
- Opishnia (3)
- Zinkiv (3)
- Komyshnia (2)
- Kovalivka (2)
- Vepryk
- Hrun
- Kyzemyn
- Rashivka
- Liutenka

== Commanders ==
List of Regiment Colonels:

- Yarema Khmelenko (1648)
- Kindrat Burlii (1648–1649)
- Pavlo Apostol (Tsarenko, silmutaneously Myrhorod colonel, 1659–60)
- Vasyl Shyman (1662–1663)
- Semen Ostrenko (1666–1668, 1672)
- Yakiv Tyshchenko (1670–1672)
- Fedir Krynytskyi (1672–1678)
- Mykhailo Samoilovych (1678–1687)
- Mykhailo Borokhovych (1687–1704)
- Stepan Troshchynskyi (1705–1709)
- Ivan Charnysh (1709–1714)
- Mykhailo Myloradovych (1715–1726)
- Havrylo Myloradovych (1727–1729)
- Hryhorii Hrabianka (1730–1738)
- Petro Haletskyi (1738–1754)
- Vasyl Rozumovskyi (1755–1762)
- Antin Kryzhanivskyi (1762–1772)
- Semen Myloradovych (1778)
- Rodion Plamenets (~1790)
