= Hadiach urban hromada =

Hadiach urban hromada Гадяцька міська громада
- Hromada
- Interactive map of Hadiach urban hromada
- Country: Ukraine
- Oblast: Poltava Oblast
- Raion: Myrhorod Raion
- Admin. center: Hadiach

Area
  - Total: 205.0 km^{2} (79.2 sq mi)

Population (2026)
  - Total: 25,645
  - Density: 125.1/km^{2} (324.0/sq mi)
- CATOTTG code: UA53060090000098426
- Settlements: 21
- Cities: 1
- Villages: 20
- Website: https://hadiach-rada.gov.ua/

Hadiach urban territorial hromada (Ukrainian: Гадяцька міська територіальна громада, romanized: Hadiatska miska terytorialna hromada) is one of the hromadas of Ukraine, located in Myrhorod Raion, Poltava Oblast. Its administrative centre is the city of Hadiach.

The hromada has a total area of 205.0 km^{2} (79.2 mi^{2}), and a population of 25,645 (as of 2026).

It was established on September 19, 2018, through the accession of the Bilenchenkivka Village Council (Hadiach Raion) to the Hadiach City Council (a city of regional significance).

In accordance with the Law of Ukraine "On Amendments to the Law of Ukraine 'On Voluntary Amalgamation of Territorial Communities' regarding the voluntary accession of village and settlement territorial communities to the territorial communities of cities of the Autonomous Republic of Crimea and cities of regional significance," communities formed through the accession of adjacent communities to cities of regional significance are recognized as capable and do not require the holding of elections.

== Composition ==
In addition to one city (Hadiach), there are 20 villages within the hromada:

- Bilenchenkivka
- Butovycheske
- Chervonyi Kut
- Dontsivshchyna
- Hrypaky
- Kharkivtsi
- Kiblytske
- Kruhlyk
- Kyiashkivske
- Kyivske
- Mali Budyshcha
- Orikhanove
- Osniahy
- Ostroverkhivka
- Petroselivka
- Pysarivshchyna
- Rudykiv
- Saranchova Dolyna
- Sary
- Stepanenky
