= Vepryk, Poltava Oblast =

Village in Poltava Oblast, Ukraine

Verpryk Веприк
- Village
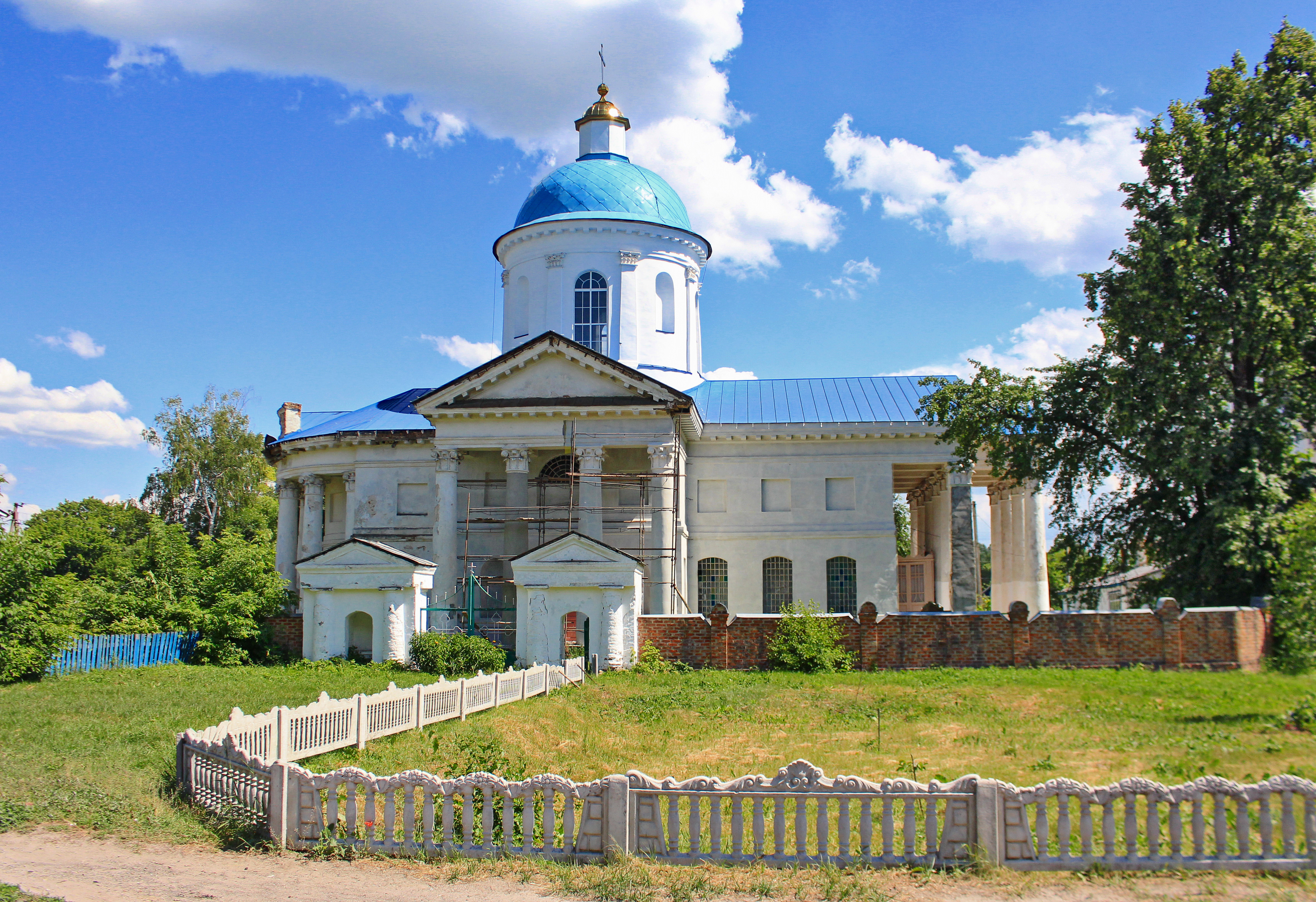
- Church of the Dormition, Vepryk

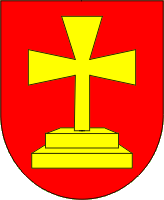
- Coat of arms

- Location within Poltava Oblast Location within Ukraine
- Coordinates: 50°22′0.8″N 34°10′35.4″E
- Country: Ukraine
- Oblast: Poltava Oblast
- Raion: Myrhorod Raion

Area
  - Total: 84.921 km^{2} (32.788 sq mi)
- Elevation: 115 m (377 ft)

Population
  - Total: 2,916

Vepryk (Ukrainian: Веприк) is a village in Myrhorod Raion, Poltava Oblast, Ukraine. It belongs to Velyki Budyshcha rural hromada, one of the hromadas of Ukraine. Vepryk has a population of 2915. The local self-government body is the Veprytsky Village Council. After the dissolution of the Hadiach Raion, it was merged into the Myrhorod Raion.

== Geography ==
It is located on the left bank of the Psel River, on both sides of its tributary of the Vepryk River. Upstream at a distance of 4.5 km is the village of Bobryk, downstream at a distance of 8 km is the village of Velbivka, on the opposite bank, is the village of Knyshivka. The river in this place is winding, forming estuaries, and old and marshy lakes. The T 1705 highway runs through the village. Following this highway will lead to Hadiach. The elevation is 115m.

== History ==
In 1764, Catherine II presented Vepryk to the last hetman of Ukraine Kirill Razumovsky.

According to the census of 1859 in Vepryk — 545 yards, 4027 inhabitants, 4 churches — (2 brick): Mykolaivska and Uspenska (built in 1823 and 1837) and 2 wooden ones: St. George's and Troitskaya (1787, 1793), 4 fairs were held per year.

Until 18 July 2020, Vepryk belonged to Hadiach Raion. The raion was abolished in July 2020 as part of the administrative reform of Ukraine, which reduced the number of raions of Poltava Oblast to four. The area of Hadiach Raion was merged into Myrhorod Raion.

=== 2022 Russian invasion of Ukraine ===
The village was at the center of hostilities during the 2022 Russian invasion. On February 28, a Russian convoy was destroyed in the village and a local gas station was blown up so that the Russians could not obtain fuel. The village was not occupied. Russians tried to advanced towards Hadiach, but were repelled.

== See also ==
- Siege of Veprik
