= Wellboy =

Ukrainian singer (born 2000)

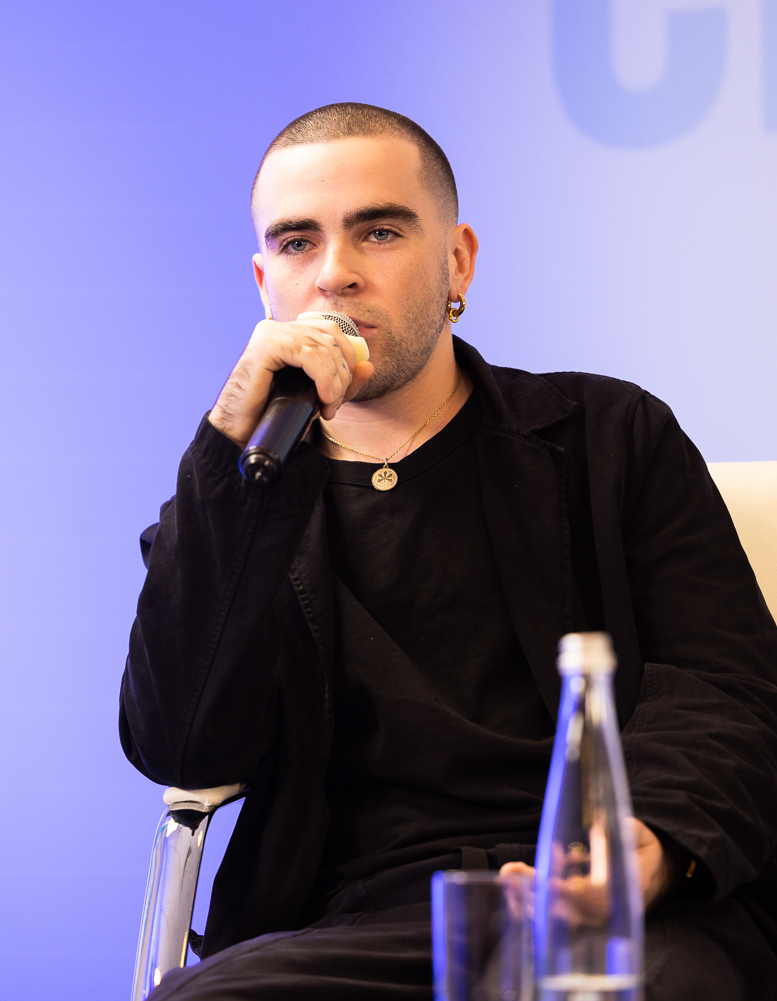
- Wellboy in November 2022

Background information
- Born: Anton Oleksandrovych Velboi; 9 June 2000 (age 25); Hrun, Sumy Oblast, Ukraine
- Genres: Pop
- Occupation: singer
- Years active: 2019–present

Anton Oleksandrovych Velboi (Ukrainian: Антон Олександрович Вельбой, IPA: [ɐnˈtɔn olekˈsɑndrowɪtʃ welʲˈbɔj]; born 9 June 2000), professionally known as Wellboy, is a Ukrainian singer and songwriter. He participated in the tenth season of the Ukrainian edition of The X Factor in the team of NK. In 2022, he was announced as one of the finalists of Vidbir 2022, competing with his song "Nozzy Bossy" and ultimately ending third.

== Career ==
One of the finalists of the Ukrainian National Selection for Eurovision 2022 with the song "Nozzy Bossy". In June 2022, Wellboy announced the termination of his collaboration with Yuriy Bardash.

Since 2022, Anton Wellboy has been working with the Papa Music label under the direction of music producer Yevhen Triplov.

On 13 July, the artist's YouTube channel premiered a song called "Cut Enemies to the Knife".

In October 2022, Wellboy released the music video "Style".

In April 2023, Anton Wellboy announced that he was leaving the label, citing disagreements with founder Alexey Golubev and music producer Yevgeny Triplov over the "Russian issue" as the reason. The artist also pointed to Golubev's alleged ties to the Russian Federation and his ex-manager Yuriy Bardash. According to Velboy, he will continue to work with concert producer Marta. According to the Ukrainian music publication Muzvar, the case of the artist and the producer was included in the top five most famous cases of breakdowns in the Ukrainian music industry.

== Discography ==
2019 – Beautiful people (single)

2019 – The Wind (single)

2019 – Baba Frost (single)
