= Velyka Bahachka Raion =

Former subdivision of Poltava Oblast, Ukraine

Velyka Bahachka Raion Великобагачанський район
- Raion
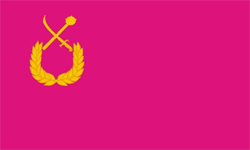
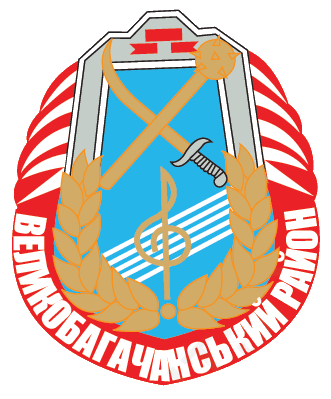
- Flag Coat of arms

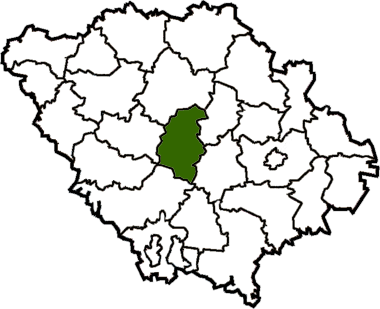
- Coordinates: 49°43′10.7214″N 33°43′23.6352″E
- Country: Ukraine
- Oblast: Poltava Oblast
- Established: 1925
- Disestablished: 18 July 2020
- Admin. center: Velyka Bahachka
- Subdivisions: List: — city councils; — settlement councils; — rural councils; Number of localities: — cities; — urban-type settlements; 72 — villages; — rural settlements

Government
  - Governor: Viktor Korduban

Area
  - Total: 1,000 km^{2} (390 sq mi)

Population (2020)
  - Total: 23,456
  - Density: 23/km^{2} (61/sq mi)
- Time zone: UTC+02:00 (EET)
  - Summer (DST): UTC+03:00 (EEST)
- Postal index: 38300—38354
- Area code: +380-5345
- Website: Official homepage

Velyka Bahachka Raion (Ukrainian: Великобагачанський район) was a raion (district) in Poltava Oblast of central Ukraine. The raion's administrative center was the urban-type settlement of Velyka Bahachka. The raion was abolished and its territory was merged into Myrhorod Raion on 18 July 2020 as part of the administrative reform of Ukraine, which reduced the number of raions of Poltava Oblast to four. The last estimate of the raion population was 23,456 (2020 est.).
