= Komyshnia =

Rural locality in Poltava Oblast, Ukraine

Komyshnia Комишня
- Rural settlement
- Location in Poltava Oblast Location in Ukraine
- Country: Ukraine
- Oblast: Poltava Oblast
- Raion: Myrhorod Raion

Population (2022)
  - Total: 1,954
- Time zone: UTC+2 (EET)
  - Summer (DST): UTC+3 (EEST)

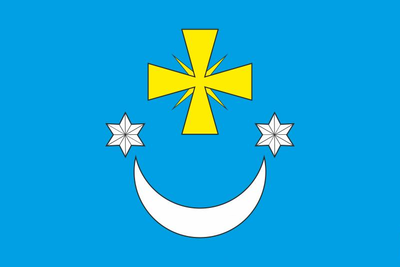
Komyshnia flag

Komyshnia (Ukrainian: Комишня; Russian: Камышня) is a rural settlement in Myrhorod Raion, Poltava Oblast, Ukraine. It is located on the Khorol, a right tributary of the Psel in the drainage basin of the Dnieper. Komyshnia hosts the administration of Komyshnia settlement hromada, one of the hromadas of Ukraine. Population: 1,954 (2022 estimate).

Until 26 January 2024, Komyshnia was designated urban-type settlement. On this day, a new law entered into force which abolished this status, and Komyshnia became a rural settlement.

== Economy ==
=== Transportation ===
The closest railway station is in Myrhorod, approximately 25 kilometres (16 mi) south of Komyshnia.

The settlement is connected by roads with Myrhorod to the south, Lubny to the southwest, Lokhvytsia to the northwest, and Hadiach to the northeast.
