= Hadiach Raion =

Former subdivision of Poltava Oblast, Ukraine

Hadiach Raion Гадяцький район
- Raion
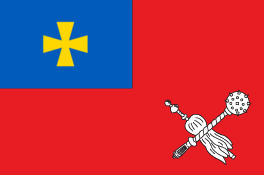
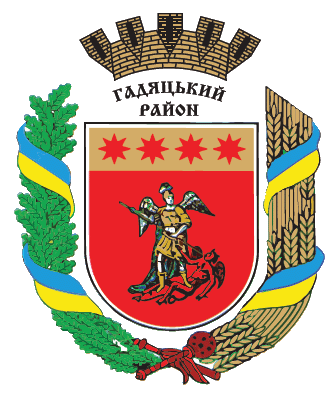
- Flag Coat of arms

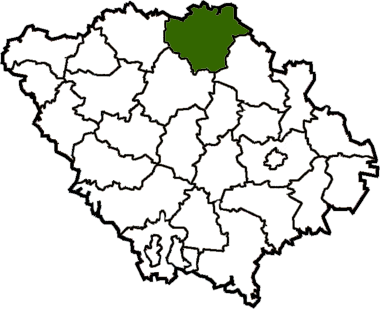
- Coordinates: 50°20′55.7802″N 33°57′19.3782″E
- Country: Ukraine
- Oblast: Poltava Oblast
- Established: 1923
- Disestablished: 18 July 2020
- Admin. center: Hadiach
- Subdivisions: List: — city councils; — settlement councils; — rural councils; Number of localities: — cities; — urban-type settlements; 94 — villages; — rural settlements

Area
  - Total: 1,595 km^{2} (616 sq mi)

Population (2020)
  - Total: 27,508
  - Density: 17.25/km^{2} (44.67/sq mi)
- Time zone: UTC+02:00 (EET)
  - Summer (DST): UTC+03:00 (EEST)
- Area code: +380
- Website: Official homepage

Hadiach Raion (Ukrainian: Гадяцький район, romanized: Hadjac'kyj rajon) was a raion (district) in Poltava Oblast in central Ukraine. The raion's administrative center was the city of Hadiach, which was incorporated separately as a city of oblast significance and did not belong to the raion. The raion was abolished on 18 July 2020 as part of the administrative reform of Ukraine, which reduced the number of raions of Poltava Oblast to four. The area of Hadiach Raion was merged into Poltava Raion. The last estimate of the raion population was 27,508 (2020 est.)

Important rivers within the Hadiach Raion included the Psel and the Khorol.

== Subdivisions ==
At the time of disestablishment, the raion consisted of five hromadas:

- Krasna Luka rural hromada with the administration in the selo of Krasna Luka;
- Liutenka rural hromada with the administration in the selo of Liutenka;
- Petrivka-Romenska rural hromada with the administration in the selo of Petrivka-Romenska;
- Serhiivka rural hromada with the administration in the selo of Serhiivka;
- Velyki Budyshcha rural hromada with the administration in the selo of Velyki Budyshcha.

== Settlements ==
- Berezova Luka
