= Velyki Budyshcha rural hromada =

Velyki Budyshcha rural hromada Великобудищанська сільська громада
- Hromada
- Interactive map of Velyki Budyshcha rural hromada
- Country: Ukraine
- Oblast: Poltava Oblast
- Raion: Myrhorod Raion

Area
  - Total: 396 km^{2} (153 sq mi)

Population
  - Total: 7,016

Velyki Budyshcha rural hromada is one of the hromadas of Myrhorod Raion in Poltava Oblast of Ukraine. Its administrative centre is the village of Velyki Budyshcha.

== Composition ==
The hromada includes 20 villages:

- Bakuty
- Bobryk
- Brovarky
- Duchyntsi
- Knyshivka
- Martynivka
- Mohylativ
- Morozivshchyna
- Pedorychi
- Plishyvets
- Shadurka
- Teple
- Tiutiurivshchyna
- Tymofiivka
- Velbivka
- Velyke
- Velyki Budyshcha (administrative centre)
- Vepryk
- Voronivshchyna
- Zapsilske
