= Romodan =

Rural locality in Poltava Oblast, Ukraine

Romodan Ромодан
- Rural settlement
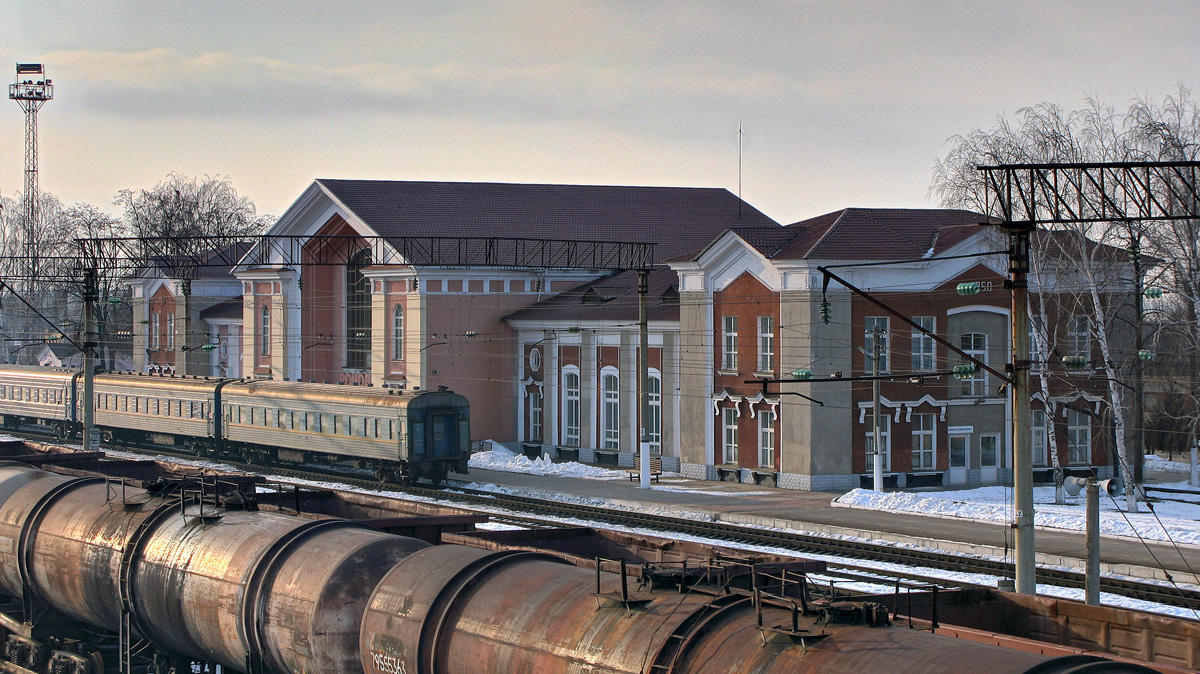
- Romodan railway station

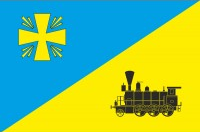
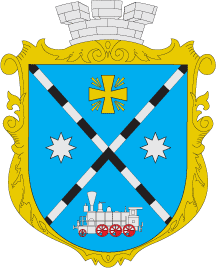
- Flag Coat of arms

- Location in Poltava Oblast Location in Ukraine
- Country: Ukraine
- Oblast: Poltava Oblast
- Raion: Myrhorod Raion

Population (2022)
  - Total: 2,669
- Time zone: UTC+2 (EET)
  - Summer (DST): UTC+3 (EEST)

Romodan (Ukrainian: Ромодан; Russian: Ромодан) is a rural settlement in Myrhorod Raion, Poltava Oblast, Ukraine. It is located northwest of the city of Poltava, at the sources of the Voinykha and the Lykhobabivka, both in the drainage basin of the Dnieper. Romodan hosts the administration of Romodan settlement hromada, one of the hromadas of Ukraine. Population: 2,669 (2022 estimate).

Until 26 January 2024, Romodan was designated urban-type settlement. On this day, a new law entered into force which abolished this status, and Romodan became a rural settlement.

== Economy ==
=== Transportation ===
Romodan railway station is a railway node, with four railway lines running from here to Poltava, Bakhmach, Kyiv, and Kremenchuk. There is intensive passenger traffic.

The settlement is connected by road with Myrhorod and with Lubny, where it has access to highway M03 connecting Kyiv and Kharkiv via Poltava.
