= Kolos (sports society) =

Ukrainian sports society

The Kolos VFST (full name: All-Ukrainian association of physical culture and sports "Kolos" of the Ukrainian Agro-Industrial Complex, Ukrainian: Всеукраїнське фізкультурно-спортивне товариство «Колос» агропромислового комплексу України, ВФСТ «Колос») is a fitness-sport society of the Agro-Industrial Complex of Ukraine, formerly a rural sports society and a trade unions - cooperative sports society that was uniting farmers, workers, servicemen, technicians of agricultural organizations, enterprises, establishments, and educational institutions. Created in 1950 under the name of "Kolhospnyk" (farmer of kolkhoz), it changed its name to Kolos in 1970.

== Description ==
In 1950, the establishment

In 1970, rebranding

On 1 January 1979, it accounted for 13,835 primary collectives (fitness teams) with over three million sportsmen.

The society was cultivating 45 types of sports.

In 1982, the society merged with its Russian counterpart, "Urozhai".

In 1990, the society was revived in the Ukrainian SSR and later - Ukraine.

== Notable athletes ==
- Ihor Razoronov, weightlifter, Donetsk Oblast
- Ivan Bohdan, wrestler, Mykolaiv Oblast

== Olympic centers ==
- Sports base "Zakarpattia", Berehove
- Luge youth sports school "Kolos", Kremenets
- Sports base "Kolos", Pidhorodnie (Ternopil Raion)
