= Myrhorod Raion =

Subdivision of Poltava Oblast, Ukraine

Myrhorod Raion Миргородський район
- Raion
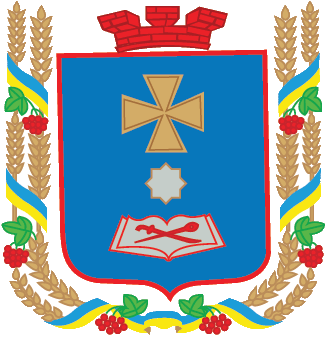
- Flag Coat of arms

- Coordinates: 50°3′24.3576″N 33°39′40.752″E
- Country: Ukraine
- Oblast: Poltava Oblast
- Established: 1923
- Admin. center: Myrhorod
- Subdivisions: 17 hromadas

Area
  - Total: 6,282.7 km^{2} (2,425.8 sq mi)

Population (2022)
  - Total: 198,076
  - Density: 31.527/km^{2} (81.655/sq mi)
- Time zone: UTC+02:00 (EET)
  - Summer (DST): UTC+03:00 (EEST)
- Area code: +380
- Website: obladmin.poltava.ua

Myrhorod Raion (Ukrainian: Миргородський район; translit.: Myrhorods'kyi raion) is a raion (district) in Poltava Oblast of central Ukraine. The raion's administrative center is the city of Myrhorod. Population:198,076 (2022 estimate).

On 18 July 2020, as part of the administrative reform of Ukraine, the number of raions of Poltava Oblast was reduced to four, and the area of Myrhorod Raion was significantly expanded. The January 2020 estimate of the raion population was 29,743 (2020 est.).

== Administrative division ==
The raion was established on 3 July 1923, by splitting off Lubny Raion. The raion's boundaries were significantly altered on January 8, 1966 and remained intact until July 2020.

=== Current ===
After the reform in July 2020, the raion consisted of 17 hromadas:

- Hadiach urban hromada with the administration in the city of Hadiach, transferred from city of the oblast significance of Hadiach and Hadiach Raion;
- Komyshnia settlement hromada with the administration in the rural settlement of Komyshnia, retained from Myrhorod Raion;
- Krasna Luka rural hromada with the administration in the selo of Krasna Luka, transferred from Hadiach Raion;
- Liutenka rural hromada with the administration in the selo of Liutenka, transferred from Hadiach Raion;
- Lokhvytsia urban hromada with the administration in the city of Lokhvytsia, transferred from Lokhvytsia Raion;
- Myrhorod urban hromada with the administration in the city of Myrhorod, transferred from city of the oblast significance of Myrhorod and retained from Myrhorod Raion;
- Petrivka-Romenska rural hromada with the administration in the selo of Petrivka-Romenska, transferred from Hadiach Raion;
- Romodan settlement hromada with the administration in the rural settlement of Romodan, retained from Myrhorod Raion and transferred from Lubny Raion;
- Sencha rural hromada with the administration in the selo of Sencha, transferred from Lokhvytsia Raion;
- Serhiivka rural hromada with the administration in the selo of Serhiivka, transferred from Hadiach Raion;
- Velyki Budyshcha rural hromada with the administration in the selo of Velyki Budyshcha, transferred from Hadiach Raion;
- Velyki Sorochyntsi rural hromada with the administration in the selo of Velyki Sorochyntsi, retained from Myrhorod Raion.
- Zavodske urban hromada with the administration in the city of Zavodske, transferred from Lokhvytsia Raion.

=== Before 2020 ===
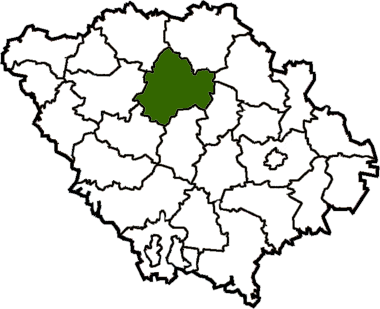
Myrhorod Raion in Poltava Oblast before 2020

Before the 2020 reform, the raion consisted of three hromadas,

- Komyshnia settlement hromada with the administration in Komyshnia;
- Romodan settlement hromada with the administration in Romodan;
- Velyki Sorochyntsi rural hromada with the administration in Velyki Sorochyntsi.

== Settlements ==
- Bakumivka
- Bilyky
- Velyka Obukhivka
- Velykyi Bairak
- Velyki Sorochyntsi
- Verkhnia Budakivka
- Vepryk
- Hadiach
- Harkushyntsi
- Hasenky
- Dibrivka
- Yerky
- Zelenyi Kut
- Zubriv
- Zuiivtsi
- Kybyntsi
- Kliushnykivka
- Komyshnia
- Maltsi
- Mali Sorochyntsi
- Myrhorod
- Ostapivka
- Panasivka
- Petrivtsi
- Polyvyane
- Popivka
- Romodan
- Savyntsi
- Slobidka
- Solontsi
- Khomutets
- Cherevky
- Cherkashchany
- Sharkivshchyna
- Shakhvorostivka
- Shulhy
- Yarmaky

== Geography ==
Myrhorod Raion is located in the north part of Poltava Oblast, on the Dnieper Lowland, on the left bank of the Dnieper Valley. The relief of the district is an undulating plain, cut by river valleys, ravines, and gullies.

The climate of the Myrhorod Raion is temperate continental. The average temperature in January is −3.7 °C, in July it is +21.4 °C, the amount of precipitation is 480–580 mm/year, which falls mainly in the summer as rain.

The landscapes are represented by forest-steppe. Chernozems dominate the territory of the Myrhorod Raion .

The Khorol, Sula and Psel rivers, left tributaries of the Dnieper, flow through the district. The river in the floodplain has many oxbow lakes and artificial lakes.

Myrhorod Raion has reserves of clay, brown coal, peat, natural gas, mineral waters. The district is located in the Eastern oil and gas region of Ukraine A mineral water plant operates on the basis of the "Mirgorodska" mineral water deposit, located in the district, and a balneological resort has been created.

The regional landscape park Hadyatskyi are located in the Myrhorod Raion .
