= Hadiach =

City in Myrhorod Raion, Poltava Oblast, Ukraine

Hadiach Гадяч
- City
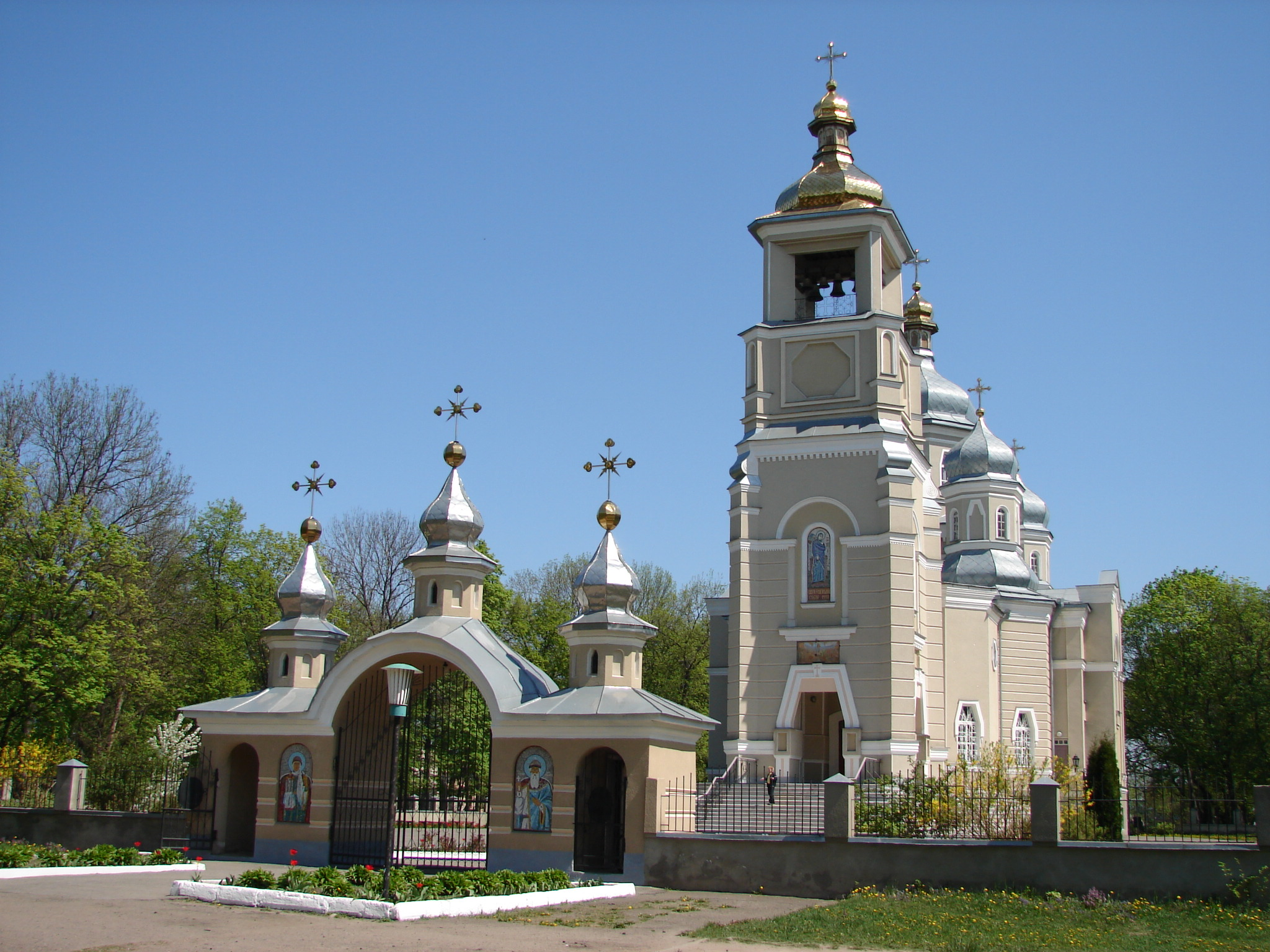
- Dormition Cathedral and belfry in Hadiach (Ukrainian Orthodox Church)

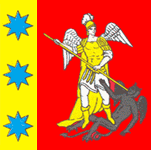
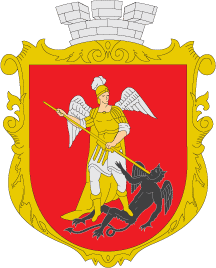
- Flag Coat of arms
- Interactive map of Hadiach
- Location of Hadiach Hadiach (Ukraine)
- Coordinates: 50°22′00″N 34°0′0″E
- Country: Ukraine
- Oblast: Poltava Oblast
- Raion: Myrhorod Raion
- Hromada: Hadiach urban hromada
- Founded: 1643^{1}

Government
  - Mayor: Volodymyr Nesterenko

Area
  - Total: 17.78 km^{2} (6.86 sq mi)
- Elevation: 132 m (433 ft)

Population (2022)
  - Total: 22,851
  - Density: 1,400/km^{2} (3,600/sq mi)
- Time zone: UTC+2 (EET)
  - Summer (DST): UTC+3 (EEST)
- Postal code: 36000—36499
- Area code: +380 532
- Website: gadiach.osp-ua.info

Hadiach (Note: Also spelled Hadyach, Gadyach, Gadiach, Haditch, Hadiache or Hadziacz.) (Ukrainian: Гадяч, pronounced [ˈɦɑdʲɐtʃ]) is a city in Myrhorod Raion, Poltava Oblast in east-central Ukraine. It hosts the administration of Hadiach urban hromada. Hadiach is located on the Psel River. Population: 22,851 (2022 estimate).

== Name ==
In addition to the Ukrainian Гадяч (Hadiach), in other languages the name of the city is Russian: Гaдяч, romanized: Gadyach, Polish: Hadziacz and Yiddish: האדיטש.

== Overview ==
Hadiach was granted city rights in 1634. At various times it was administratively located in the Kiev Voivodeship, Cossack Hetmanate, and Poltava Governorate. It was the place of signing of the Treaty of Hadiach in 1658. In 1661 it was granted by the Sejm of the Polish–Lithuanian Commonwealth to Yurii Khmelnytsky.

During the times of Cossack Hetmanate, Hadiach was a regimental capital and the residence of Zaporizhian Hetman Ivan Briukhovetsky, whose election led to the division of the Hetmanate along the Dnieper river. In 1802 it became a povit centre of the Russian Empire.

Hadiach is one of the main points of interest to Hasidic Jews visiting Ukraine due to the old cemetery that is on the river running through the city, where Shneur Zalman of Liadi is buried.

During World War II, in August and September 1943, the German occupiers operated the Dulag 124 prisoner-of-war camp in the town.

Until 18 July 2020, Hadiach was designated as a city of oblast significance and did not belong to Hadiach Raion even though it was the center of the raion. As part of the administrative reform of Ukraine, which reduced the number of raions of Poltava Oblast to four, the city was merged into Myrhorod Raion.

During the 2022 Russian Invasion of Ukraine, there were skirmishes along this town and a Russian tank reportedly was spotted in the Psel River.

== Population ==
=== Ethnic groups ===
Distribution of the population by ethnicity according to the 2001 census:

Ethnic groups in Hadiach
	percent
Ukrainians	94.45%
Russians	4.69%
Belarusians	0.36%
Armenians	0.07%
Tatars	0.07%
others	0.36%

=== Language ===
Distribution of the population by native language according to the 2001 census:

Language	Percentage
Ukrainian	95.28%
Russian	4.3%
other/undecided	0.42%

== Geography ==
=== Climate ===
Climate data for Hadiach (1981–2010)
Month	Jan	Feb	Mar	Apr	May	Jun	Jul	Aug	Sep	Oct	Nov	Dec	Year
Mean daily maximum °C (°F)	−2.1 (28.2)	−1.2 (29.8)	4.8 (40.6)	14.3 (57.7)	21.3 (70.3)	24.4 (75.9)	26.4 (79.5)	25.8 (78.4)	19.4 (66.9)	12.2 (54.0)	3.8 (38.8)	−0.8 (30.6)	12.4 (54.3)
Daily mean °C (°F)	−4.7 (23.5)	−4.4 (24.1)	0.8 (33.4)	9.0 (48.2)	15.2 (59.4)	18.6 (65.5)	20.4 (68.7)	19.4 (66.9)	13.7 (56.7)	7.6 (45.7)	0.9 (33.6)	−3.5 (25.7)	7.8 (46.0)
Mean daily minimum °C (°F)	−7.2 (19.0)	−7.4 (18.7)	−2.5 (27.5)	4.4 (39.9)	9.6 (49.3)	13.4 (56.1)	15.1 (59.2)	13.9 (57.0)	9.0 (48.2)	3.9 (39.0)	−1.5 (29.3)	−5.9 (21.4)	3.7 (38.7)
Average precipitation mm (inches)	42.4 (1.67)	41.3 (1.63)	42.3 (1.67)	42.0 (1.65)	48.6 (1.91)	75.5 (2.97)	70.9 (2.79)	46.9 (1.85)	55.2 (2.17)	51.2 (2.02)	46.6 (1.83)	44.3 (1.74)	607.2 (23.91)
Average precipitation days (≥ 1.0 mm)	9.1	9.2	7.8	7.3	8.0	9.3	8.9	5.8	7.1	7.4	7.8	9.4	97.1
Average relative humidity (%)	85.2	82.2	77.3	66.7	63.3	68.9	70.4	69.0	74.9	80.0	86.3	86.6	75.9
Source: World Meteorological Organization

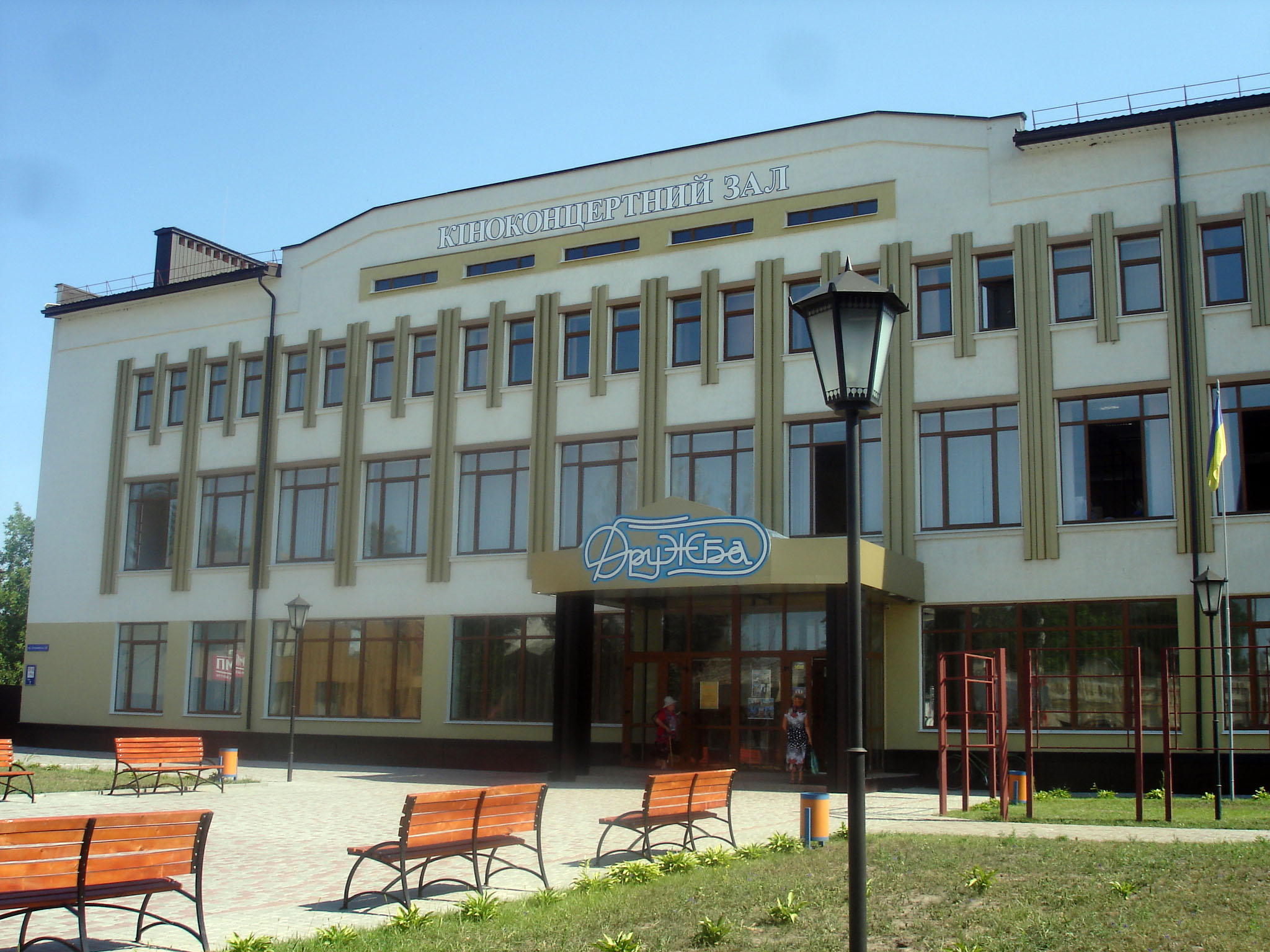
Municipal concert hall

== In literature ==
The main characters in Nikolai Gogol's story Ivan Fyodorovich Shponka and His Aunt are from Hadiach (Gadyach in the 1957 translation by David Magarshack).

== Residents ==
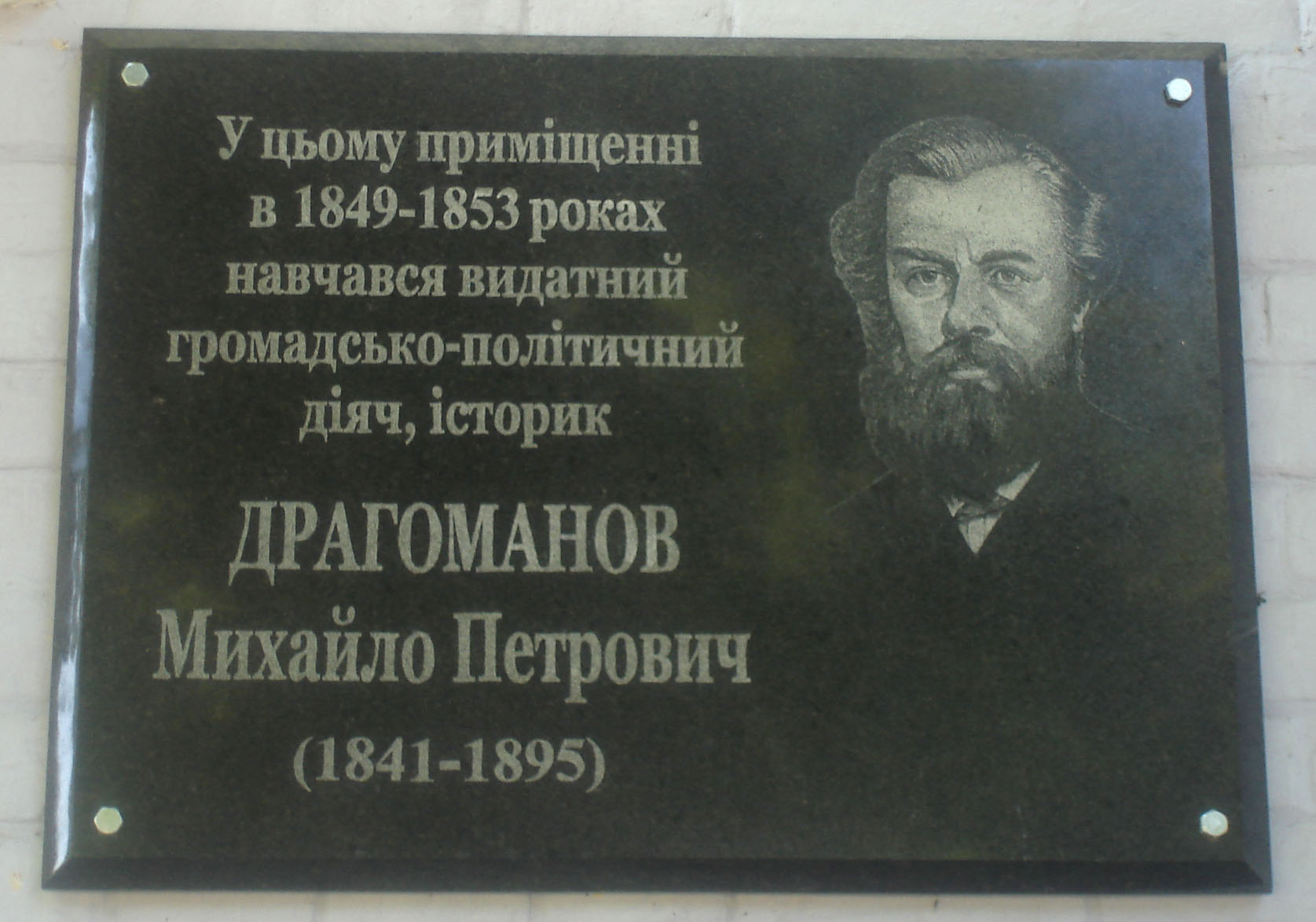
Memorial plaque to Mykhailo Drahomanov

- Mykhailo Drahomanov (1841–1895), political theorist, economist, historian, philosopher, and ethnographer
- Olena Pchilka, mother of Lesya Ukrainka and a sister of Drahomanov

== See also ==
- Hadiach Regiment and Zinkiv Regiment
