= Artistic Ukrainian Movement =

Artistic-literary organization of Ukrainian émigrés in Europe

The Artistic Ukrainian Movement (Ukrainian: Мистецький український рух), or MUR (Ukrainian: МУР), was a literary and artistic organisation of Ukrainian writers living in displaced persons camps in post-war West Germany from 1945 until 1948. The MUR was founded in September 1945 in Fürth near Nuremberg, by a committee headed by Ulas Samchuk and comprising Ivan Bahrianyi, Viktor Petrov, Yuri Kosach, Ihor Kostetskyi, Ivan Maistrenko and Yuri Sherekh. It was among the most productive periods for Volodymyr Derzhavyn.

Yuri Kosach, author of On Guard of the Nation, wrote of the "separation" of Ukrainian literature from Europe and the "gap" between humanism and the Ukrainian literary tradition caused by the Eurocentric Dmytro Dontsov and The Bulletin. Dontsov's works were based upon the principles of idealism, nationalism, heroism, and voluntarism and acquired the perceptions of negative or sarcastic labels of "traditional Europeanism", "true Occidentalism", gothic, and literary imperialism. According to Kosach, Ukrainian literary works were founded on the chivalry, activist psychology, and heroism.

During its existence, three congresses were held in 1945, 1947 and 1948, and several additional conferences were held. The MUR's work largely focused on modernisation and globalisation of Ukrainian culture, and had 61 members at its height.
