= Why I Do Not Want to Return to the USSR =

1946 pamphlet by Ivan Bahrianyi

- Author: Ivan Bahrianyi
- Original title: Чому я не хочу вертатись до СССР?
- Translator: Roman Smal-Stocki
- Language: Ukrainian
- Genre: Pamphlet
- Published: 1946
- Publication place: Germany
- Media type: Print

Why I Do Not Want to Return to the USSR (Ukrainian: Чому я не хочу вертатись до СССР?, romanized: Chomu ya ne khochu vertatys do SSSR?) is a pamphlet by the Ukrainian writer Ivan Bahrianyi, written in a displaced persons camp in occupied Germany and published in 1946. Cast as an open letter, it sets out why the author, a survivor of Soviet prisons, refused to be repatriated to the Soviet Union, and argues that return would mean death or the camps for those sent back. It circulated in several editions under two different titles and was translated into English in 1946. The historian Marta Dyczok describes it as having become "the manifesto of all Ukrainian refugees".

== Background ==
Under agreements signed by the United States, the United Kingdom and the Soviet Union at the Yalta Conference on 11 February 1945, liberated Soviet citizens were to be handed over to Soviet authority. The Western Allies applied a citizenship cut-off date of 1 September 1939: people who had been Polish, Romanian or Baltic citizens before the war were exempt from compulsory return, while those from the pre-war Ukrainian SSR were not. Bahrianyi, born in Okhtyrka in 1906, fell into the second group.

Around two million people were transferred to Soviet control from western-controlled zones between May and September 1945. Allied policy then began to change: on 12 February 1946 the United Nations General Assembly adopted Resolution 8(I), which held that refugees who had expressed "valid objections" to returning should not be compelled to do so, and the principle was written into the constitution of the International Refugee Organization in December 1946. Of the more than two million Ukrainians in the western zones in 1945, some 200,000 remained after the repatriations of 1945–46.

Bahrianyi had spent years in Soviet detention before the war and settled after 1945 at the Neu-Ulm displaced persons camp, where he was among the founders of the writers' group the Artistic Ukrainian Movement (MUR) and later of the Ukrainian Revolutionary Democratic Party.

== Publication ==
Ukrainian sources date the writing of the text to 1945 and its appearance as a separate booklet to 1946. It was issued under two distinct titles. Editions titled Chomu ya ne khochu vertatys do SSSR? ("Why I do not want to return to the USSR?") appeared in Winnipeg, published by the Committee of Ukrainians of Canada in 38 pages; editions titled Chomu ya ne khochu vertatysia na "rodinu" ("Why I do not want to return to the 'motherland'") appeared in London, printed by the Ukrainian Central Bureau in 30 pages, and at Neu-Ulm. The second form of the title is the one used by the Internet Encyclopedia of Ukraine. The text refers to itself as a letter, and the author notes in it that publication may endanger his surviving relatives.

The earliest firmly dated appearance is an English translation, "Why I Do Not Want To Go 'Home'", published in The Ukrainian Quarterly in New York in spring 1946.

== Content ==
The pamphlet is written in the first person and presents the author as speaking for "hundreds of thousands" of Ukrainians in the same position. It moves from his childhood witness of Bolshevik killings in his family, through forced collectivization, the famine of 1932–33 and the destruction of the Ukrainian intelligentsia in the 1930s, to his own arrests and imprisonment, the methods of the NKVD, and the suppression of the churches. It repeatedly turns Soviet published figures against the state, and draws an explicit comparison between Stalin and Hitler. The text closes conditionally: the author states that he will return when the Soviet system has fallen.

== Translations and circulation ==
According to the historian Olha Podobied, the pamphlet was translated into English by Roman Smal-Stotsky and subsequently appeared in German, Spanish and Italian. Dyczok records an English translation published at Winnipeg in 1946. The 1946 Ukrainian Quarterly translation is the earliest that has been located in a library collection; separate catalogue records for the German, Spanish and Italian editions have not been identified.

Podobied documents public readings of the text at the Dingolfing displaced persons camp in 1946 and broadcasts of extracts by the Ukrainian-language service of the Voice of America in 1950.

== Reception ==
Dyczok treats the pamphlet within the publicity campaign mounted by Ukrainian organisations in Canada against forcible repatriation, writing that it "became the manifesto of all Ukrainian refugees" and that such publications increased public understanding of the refugees' objections, although Western authorities often did not believe their accounts. The Internet Encyclopedia of Ukraine describes the brochure as "particularly popular". Podobied argues that it shaped an "ideology of non-return" among the Ukrainian emigration.

A claim that the pamphlet was used by Eleanor Roosevelt in her United Nations work, and that it thereby contributed to the adoption of the Universal Declaration of Human Rights, is widely repeated in Ukrainian commemorative writing; Podobied states that the content of Bahrianyi's work influenced Roosevelt's position on forcible repatriation. Dyczok, however, attributes Roosevelt's use of Ukrainian material to a different pamphlet, "The plight of Ukrainian DPs", which was circulated to delegates at the United Nations. The principle protecting refugees with "valid objections" from compulsory return had in any case been adopted by the General Assembly in February 1946.

== Soviet response ==
According to the Foreign Intelligence Service of Ukraine, which has published material from its archives, the pamphlet prompted Soviet state security to open a case file on Bahrianyi, classified under the heading "Ukrainian nationalist", on 31 December 1946. Copies of the brochure were attached to the file as evidence of anti-Soviet activity and passages from it were quoted in the case materials, alongside excerpts from his other published work. The agency describes subsequent operations against him, including an attempted recruitment in the 1950s, a campaign of forged letters to Western newspapers, and instructions to prepare his assassination.

== See also ==
- Operation Keelhaul
- Displaced persons camps in post–World War II Europe
- Tiger Trappers
