= Garden of Gethsemane (novel) =

1950 novel by Ivan Bahrianyi

- Author: Ivan Bahrianyi
- Original title: Сад Гетсиманський
- Language: Ukrainian
- Genre: Autobiographical novel
- Set in: Kharkiv, Ukrainian SSR, 1937–1938
- Published: 1950
- Publisher: Ukraina
- Publication place: Neu-Ulm
- Pages: 560

Garden of Gethsemane (Ukrainian: Сад Гетсиманський, romanized: Sad Hetsymanskyi) is a novel by the Ukrainian writer Ivan Bahrianyi, written in emigration and first published in 1950 by the Ukraina press in Neu-Ulm, West Germany. Drawing on the author's own imprisonment by the NKVD, it follows Andrii Chumak, a young Ukrainian arrested during the Great Purge of 1937–1938, through interrogation and torture in the prisons of Kharkiv. Together with Tyhrolovy (1944) it is regarded as Bahrianyi's most important work; the two novels brought him a posthumous Shevchenko National Prize in 1992.

== Background ==
Bahrianyi was arrested in Kharkiv on 16 April 1932 and, after eleven months in the city's internal prison, was sent into exile in the Far East. He was arrested a second time in 1938, accused of belonging to a nationalist counter-revolutionary organisation, and held in the Kharkiv NKVD prison until his release in 1940. That second imprisonment is the direct source of the novel, which the Internet Encyclopedia of Ukraine describes as a book about the Yezhov terror.

In a note prefacing the first edition the author stated that the surnames of the investigators, prison staff and prisoners in the book are authentic, apart from a few that were altered.

After the Second World War Bahrianyi settled in a displaced persons camp in Neu-Ulm, where he became a central figure of the postwar Ukrainian emigration, founded the Ukrainian Revolutionary Democratic Party and edited the newspaper Ukrainski visti. He wrote the novel there, and it was issued by the Ukraina publishing house.

== Title ==
The title refers to Gethsemane, the garden at the foot of the Mount of Olives where, according to the Gospels, Jesus prayed in anguish on the night before his crucifixion and was betrayed by Judas Iscariot. The parallel is drawn inside the novel itself: in the opening chapter the village priest reads the Gethsemane passage aloud to the Chumak family, and the plot that follows turns on a betrayal from within their own circle.

== Plot ==
The action begins in 1937. Yakiv Chumak, an old village blacksmith, dies before his sons can reach home, and the village priest reads the family the Gospel account of Gethsemane, Judas's betrayal and Peter's denial. Four sons gather: Mykola, a commander in the Red Army; Mykhailo, a sailor and party organiser in the Black Sea Fleet; Serhii, a military pilot; and the youngest, Andrii, an engineer and aviator who had been exiled six years earlier as a political offender and had escaped four years after that. He is arrested the same night, and concludes that someone close to him has informed on him. At the district NKVD office its head, Safyhin, offers him a choice between "earning" a pardon and being sentenced to death. He is then taken to Kharkiv.

In the inner NKVD prison he is processed by an officer named Nechaieva and put into a cell of some thirty men, most of them from the intelligentsia, nearly all of whom have already confessed under torture to invented counter-revolutionary crimes and are awaiting execution or the camps. An older prisoner, Okhrimenko, a former Makhnovist, teaches him the rules and the argot of the prison.

The investigation is run mainly by Serheiev, assisted by Velykin, who brings the beatings, and Frei, who conducts the ideological arguments; Safyhin reappears in Kharkiv to add his own pressure. Andrii is required to confess to spying for Japan. He is beaten, held in stress positions and force-fed when he goes on hunger strike, but signs nothing. To his cellmate Davyd he formulates the novel's central proposition: it is better to die once, on the execution ground, than to "die twice" by first betraying one's own. In one confrontation he turns the interrogation back on Serheiev, telling him that he is himself a ruined man; from then on Serheiev stops beating him and only pretends to in front of his colleagues.

When Velykin curses his mother and spits in his face, Andrii strikes him with a chair. Frei orders twenty days in the punishment cell, which Andrii experiences as a deliverance. He is taken out on the sixteenth day, beaten again for refusing to sign the protocol, and returned to his cell with a broken rib.

The case passes to Donets, who speaks Ukrainian and appeals to their shared nationality before threatening him. After an epidemic of skin ulcers the prisoners are moved in a van disguised as a bread lorry, which breaks down in the street in front of passers-by, to a far larger prison. During one such transfer his sister Halia is pushed into the same van; she tells him that their mother has died and that Kateryna, the woman he loves, was broken by interrogation and has lost her reason, and passes him a note in her hand.

In the final part Andrii stages a fake recruitment of Donets within earshot of Frei, and the investigator is arrested. Barbarov, a disgraced NKVD officer placed in a cell among his own former victims, is drowned by them in the latrine bucket. Andrii then retracts his accusation before Frei and a prosecutor, declaring the whole thing a bluff staged to show what a recruitment is worth, and a further charge of provocation against the NKVD is added to his case. His interrogation passes to the inexperienced Hordyi and then to a quiet, unnamed officer who lets him read his own file, from which he learns that Kateryna was forced to sign a statement against him. He contemplates suicide and is stopped by Sanko, a boy in his cell.

At a confrontation staged by Serheiev he is at last shown the informer: a man named Zhgut, in whom he recognises the priest who had read the Gospel in his father's house. His last cellmate before trial is Kopaiev, an arrested NKVD district chief, who explains that the warder handing out tobacco is the executioner and that the shootings are covered by the noise of running engines. In the hall of the tribunal Andrii sees his three brothers again and satisfies himself that none of them informed on him. All four brothers and their young sister are sentenced to death, and none asks for clemency; an appeal lodged from outside leads to the sentences being quashed on a procedural technicality, and the executions are commuted to twenty years of penal labour.

== Themes ==
The novel is built around the confrontation between the prisoner and his interrogators, and its argument is carried largely by their dialogue: the investigators defend a world in which a human being counts for nothing and there will always be enough people however many are killed, while Andrii holds that the political regime is transient and the person is not. Ukrainian critics have described Bahrianyi's protagonist as a recurring type in his fiction — a man who refuses to be drawn into the service of the totalitarian state and whose only aim is to remain human where that is not permitted.

The investigators are not treated as interchangeable villains: each is given a distinct method, biography and form of self-deception, and they are shown to be caught in the same machinery as their prisoners.

== Publication history ==
The first edition appeared in 1950 in Neu-Ulm, published by the Ukraina press in 560 pages. Bahrianyi's writing had been banned in Soviet Ukraine after his first arrest, and the novel circulated only abroad during his lifetime. Later Ukrainian editions include those issued by Folio in Kharkiv in 2012, 2013 and 2017; the 2013 edition carries an afterword and notes by Mykhailo Spodarets.

== Translations ==
A French translation by Grégoire Alexinsky, Le Jardin de Gethsémani, was published by Nouvelles Éditions Latines in Paris in 1961 and reissued by the same house in 2005. Bahrianyi's other major novel, Tyhrolovy, was translated into English as The Hunters and the Hunted in 1954, and into Dutch, German, Russian and Spanish.

== Reception and legacy ==
Writing in the Ukrainian outlet Rubryka, Nadiika Pototska described Bahrianyi as the first novelist to write about the Gulag, "nearly twenty years before Solzhenitsyn's The Gulag Archipelago" — a book first published in Paris in 1973. In 2019 the novel was included in 100 Notable Books in Ukrainian, a list compiled by PEN Ukraine and the magazine The Ukrainians. In 1992 Bahrianyi was posthumously awarded the Shevchenko National Prize for Tyhrolovy and Garden of Gethsemane. Bahrianyi remained a target of Soviet security operations throughout his years in emigration; material published by the Foreign Intelligence Service of Ukraine describes KGB efforts to recruit and discredit him, and later to have him killed, with the novels he had published abroad forming part of the case against him. In June 1959 Bahrianyi took part in a consultation with the United States House Committee on Un-American Activities on artistic life under Communist rule, published as Control of the Arts in the Communist Empire; the novel is discussed there under the title Gethsemane Garden.

== Adaptations ==
A four-part television film, Sad Hetsymanskyi, was produced by the Ukrtelefilm studio in 1993. It was written and directed by Rostyslav Synko, photographed by Mykhailo Ivanov and scored by Valentyn Silvestrov; Oleh Savkin played Andrii Chumak and Raisa Nedashkivska his mother. It was filmed in Kharkiv.

== See also ==
- Tiger Trappers
- Great Purge
- Gulag
