= URDP =

URDP may refer to:

- Ukrainian Revolutionary Democratic Party
- Union for the Reconstruction and Development of Congo
- Radical Party of Oleh Liashko
