= Mykhailo Voskobiinyk =

Ukrainian émigré politician

Mykahilo Voskobiinyk
- Михайло Воскобійник

Head of the Ukrainian National Council
- In office 1989–1992
- President: Mykola Plaviuk
- Prime Minister: Ivan Samiilenko
- Preceded by: Pavlo Lymarenko
- Succeeded by: Position abolished

Personal details
- Born: 21 November 1918 Myrhorod, Ukrainian State
- Died: 15 September 2001 (aged 82) Florida, United States
- Party: OUN-M; Ukrainian Revolutionary Democratic Party
- Education: Kharkiv University; Heidelberg University; Syracuse University; University of Pennsylvania

Mykhailo Hryhorovych Voskobiinyk (Ukrainian: Михайло Григорович Воскобійник; 21 November 1918 – 15 September 2001), also known as Michael Voskobiynyk, was a Ukrainian historian, journalist and political activist, who served as last head of the United States-based Ukrainian National Council in 1989–1992.

== Biography ==
Voskobiinyk was born in 1918 in Myrhorod, then part of Poltava Governorate of the Ukrainian State, to a family of farmers. His father became a victim of dekulakization and was executed as an "enemy of the people" in 1937, although the family was officially informed, that he had been exiled to Siberia. After graduating from school in 1935, Voskobiinyk found employment as a painter and musician at a local flour mill, before enrolling as a student at the history faculty of Kharkiv University. According to declassified information from the Soviet Ministry of Security, starting from 1940 Voskobiynyk was a member of OUN-M, having come in contact with the organization's representatives while on student practice in Western Ukraine. After graduating in 1941, he returned to Myrhorod, where he served as the editor of a local newspaper, which was published under German occupation during World War II. On that post he publicly expressed anti-Soviet views, and as a result was forced to emigrate following the return of Red Army to Ukraine.

Following the end of the war, Voskobiinyk spent some time in a displaced persons camp in Neu-Ulm, Germany. Together with fellow inmate Ivan Bahrianyi, he organized a campaign against forced repatriation of Ukrainians to the Soviet Union. During that time he studied political science at Heidelberg University and joined the ranks of Ukrainian Revolutionary Democratic Party, editing its press organs. Voskobiinyk cooperated with Radio Free Europe/Radio Liberty and Voice of America, and in 1952 was elected deputy head executive of the Ukrainian National Council. Starting from 1951, he became an object of attention from KGB. In 1957 Voskobiinyk and his family emigrated to the United States. In 1964 he completed studies at the Syracuse University, and in 1972 graduated with a Ph.D from the University of Pennsylvania. He was a member of several Ukrainian émigré scientific organizations, including the United States chapter of Shevchenko Scientific Society. Between 1966 and 1987 he taught history at the Central Connecticut State University.

In 1975 Voskobiinyk became the chairman of the Ukrainian Revolutionary Democratic Party, and in 1989 was appointed head of the Ukrainian National Council, which served as the parliament of Ukrainian People's Republic in exile. On 22 August 1992, almost one year after the restoration of Ukrainian independence, Voskobiinyk attended a solemn session of the Ukrainian parliament in Kyiv and officially resigned from his post, recognizing Ukraine as legitimate successor of the Ukrainian People's Republic. In 1995 he resigned from his post as party leader. Voskobiinyk died on 15 September 2001 in Florida, and was buried at the Ukrainian cemetery in Bound Brook, New Jersey.
