= Myrhorod =

City in Poltava Oblast, Ukraine

Myrhorod Миргород
- City
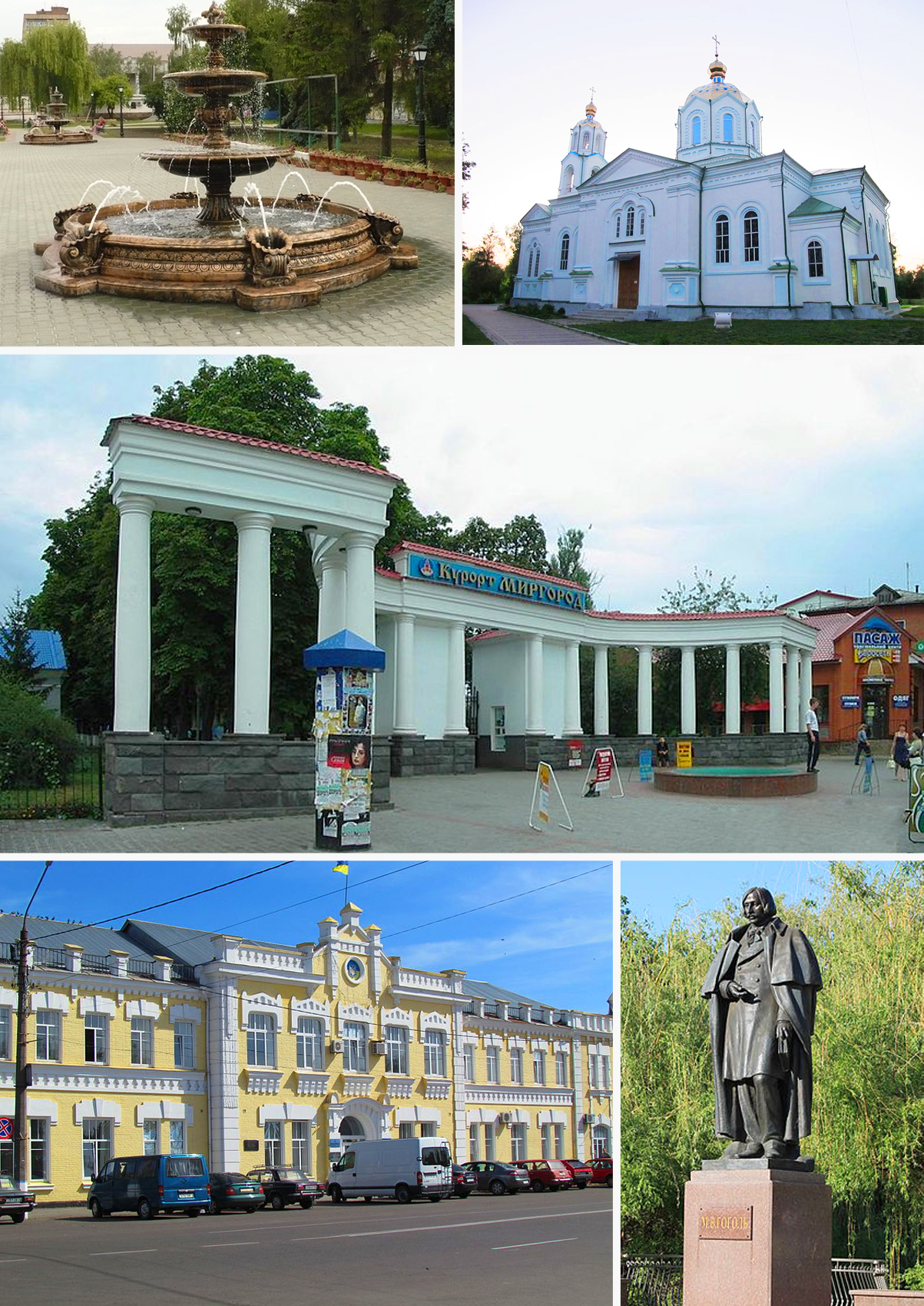
- Top:A mineral fountain in Vodohraji Zentralnyi Square. Myrhorod Assumption Cathedral, Middle:Myrhorodkurort Resort Spa, Bottom:Myrhorod City hall, Nikolai Gogol Monument in Glory Park (all item from left to right)

- Flag Coat of arms
- Interactive map of Myrhorod
- Location within Poltava Oblast Location within Ukraine
- Coordinates: 49°58′N 33°36′E
- Country: Ukraine
- Oblast: Poltava Oblast
- Raion: Myrhorod Raion
- Hromada: Myrhorod urban hromada
- Founded: 1575

Area
  - Total: 20 km^{2} (7.7 sq mi)
- Elevation: 105 m (344 ft)

Population (2022)
  - Total: 37,886
- Website: myrgorod.pl.ua

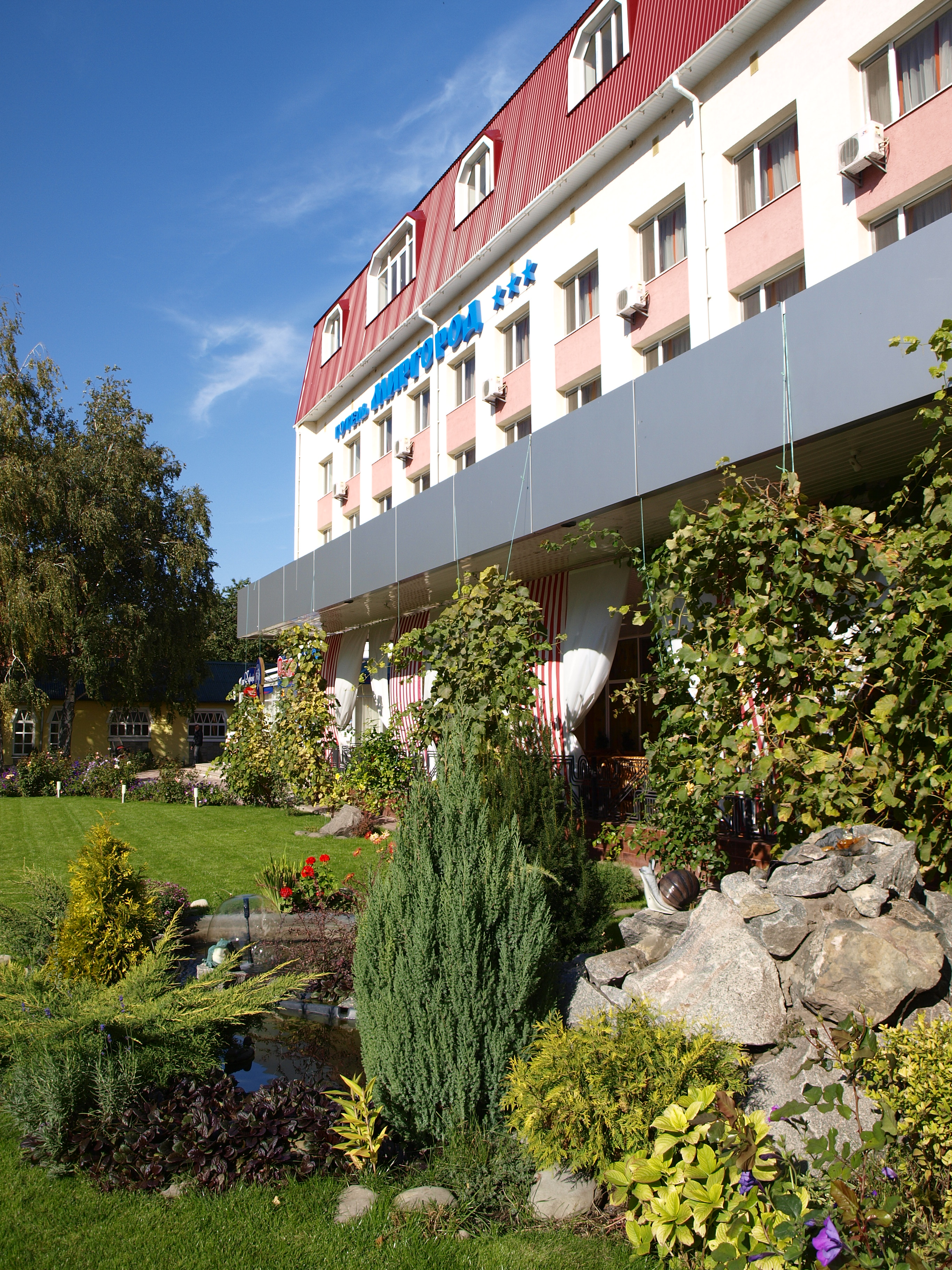
Hotel Myrhorod

Myrhorod (Ukrainian: Миргород, pronounced [ˈmɪrɦorod]) is a city in Poltava Oblast, central Ukraine. It serves as the administrative center of Myrhorod Raion. Myrhorod also hosts the administration of Myrhorod urban hromada, one of the hromadas of Ukraine. It is located on the Khorol River. Population: 37,886 (2022 estimate).

== History ==
The town was founded either in the 12th or 13th century as an eastern border fort of Kievan Rus'. According to legend, the fort was a place of peace negotiations that gave it its name (literally the City of Peace).

From 1471 to 1667 the town was part of the Kiev Voivodeship of the Grand Duchy of Lithuania and the Crown of the Kingdom of Poland.

Myrhorod was first mentioned in chronicles in 1575 when Stephen Báthory made it a regiment city. According to some historians, there was an earlier mentioning of the city in 1530, when the city coat of arms were established - yellow cross over an eight-pointed star, which signifies the victory of Christianity over Islam. Myrhorod was a royal city of Poland.

Myrhorod was the regimental base of the Myrhorod Cossacks who were very active in several Ukrainian Cossack uprisings, particularly during the peasants'-and-cossacks' revolt of 1638 under the leadership of Hetman Yakiv Ostrianytsia against the Polish nobility (szlachta). The Myrhorod Cossack regiment was among the best units in the army of Hetman Bohdan Khmelnytsky during the Khmelnytsky Uprising (1648–1654).

After the Treaty of Pereyaslav, the city became an uezd city, the centre for the Myrhorod regiment. The famous Sorochyntsy Fair is located 25 km from Myrhorod.

Since 1912, Myrhorod is known for its underground mineral waters.

A local newspaper is published here since February 1919.

Since 1920 Myrhorod is also known as a resort town.

In 1999, an English [Language] Resource Center was established at Myrhorod School No. 9, one of four such centres opened in Ukraine with the continuous help from Siena College since 1995. Other contributors to this project were Americans for Democracy in Ukraine (ADU), Canadian Credit Bank, and Narodna Kasa from Montreal, Canada. In 1995 a group of Myrhorod teachers, former participants at the seminars conducted by methodologists from Siena College Teacher Training Institute, organized Poltava Oblast's English Teachers' Association. The Myrhorod English Resource Center is supervised by the local Teachers' Association.

Until 18 July 2020, Myrhorod was designated as a city of oblast significance and did not belong to Myrhorod Raion even though it was the center of the raion. As part of the administrative reform of Ukraine, which reduced the number of raions of Poltava Oblast to four, the city was merged into Myrhorod Raion.

On April 2, 2022, the invaders fired 3 missiles at infrastructure facilities in the city. The air defense forces of the Armed Forces of Ukraine managed to destroy several enemy cruise missiles. However, the shelling damaged the runway of the Myrhorod air base, the airfield infrastructure, and caused a fire at the fuel and lubricants warehouse.

On the night of April 8–9, 2022, Russian invaders shelled an infrastructure facility in the city, with two victims reported.

== Population ==
=== Ethnic groups ===
Distribution of the population by ethnicity according to the 2001 census:

Ethnic groups in Myrhorod
	percent
Ukrainians	89.62%
Russians	9.02%
Belarusians	0.50%
Armenians	0.16%
others	0.70%

=== Language ===
Distribution of the population by native language according to the 2001 census:

Language	Percentage
Ukrainian	88.26%
Russian	11.34%
other/undecided	0.4%

== Tourist attractions ==
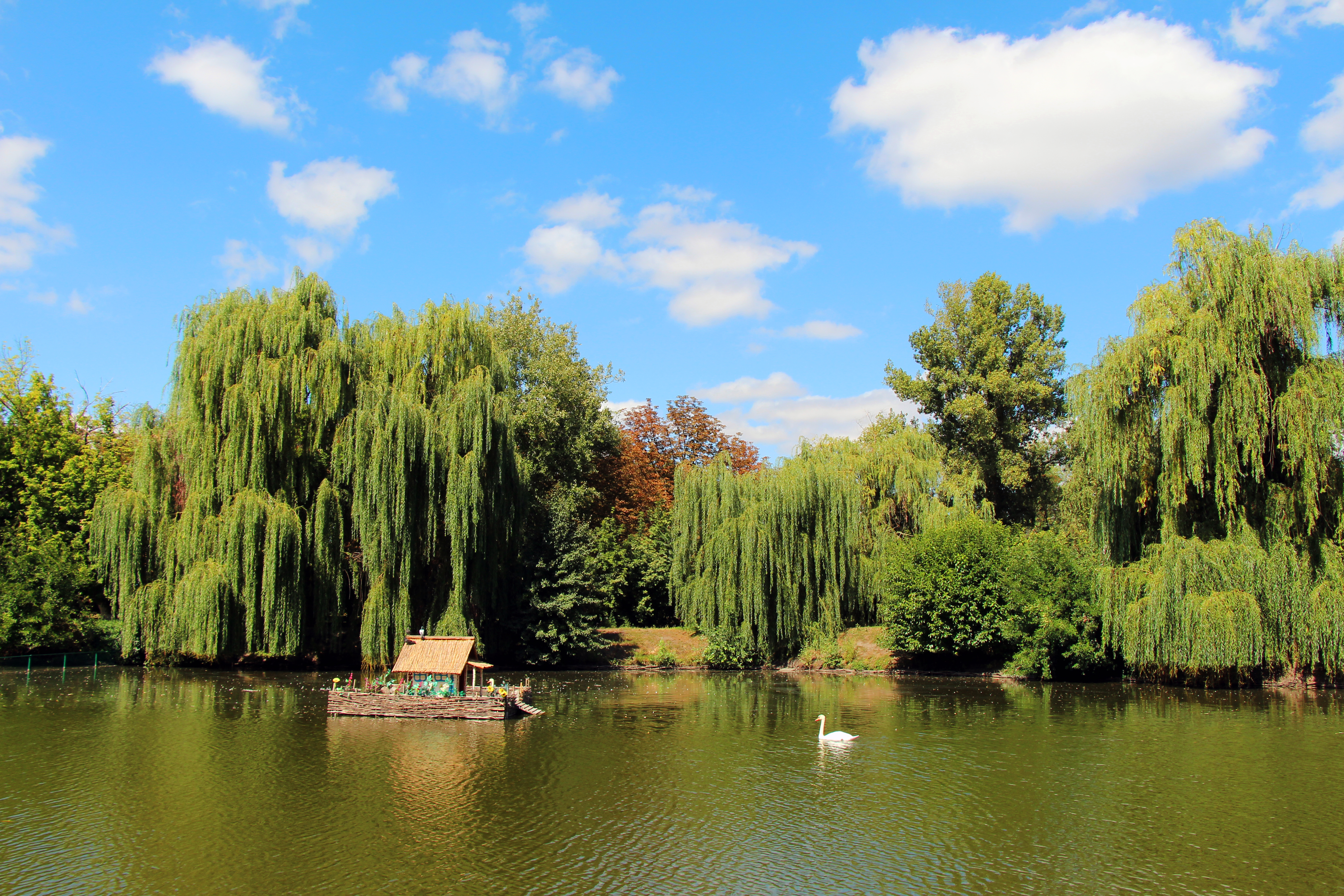
Berezovyi Hai park in Myrhorod

"Myrhorodska" water is described as "slightly mineralised natrium chloride water". It is clear and tastes a little odd, part of the taste being attributable to what is, in effect, table salt. Multiple other dissolved minerals also contribute to the taste and, of course, it is the precise balance of these that is thought to produce the claimed health benefits. For its unique health curative effects, "Myrhorodska" water is recommended by doctors for people suffering from gastritis, colitis and other disorders of the digestive system, particularly those with a lower level of stomach acidity than is considered average. It is also widely drunk as table water because it quenches thirst effectively and produces general effects considered to be beneficial to health.

There are several health resorts in the town (at least four). The most extensive and by far the best equipped of these is Myrhorod Resort (Ukrainian: Миргород Курорт). This particular spa consists of four individual sanatoria, each one specialising in one or more distinct areas - diabetes, cardiovascular disease, ENT, gastrointestinal problems, etc. and are open for medical treatments six days a week (Sundays excluded). An integral part of any treatment is one of nine diet regimes, although these are recommended and not enforced.

The whole complex is located right in the middle of the city and is spaced out in a large expanse of sandy woodland with the Khorol River providing several areas suitable for bathing. It has a musical fountain, (opened in 2010), and, at night, a large illuminated windmill, (opened in 2011), standing close to the main administrative building. Other features include pedaloes, boats, several restaurants and cafés, dancing, live music, rides through the woods in a horse-drawn carriage, a theatre, organised excursions and a large 'water feature' with geese, ducks (including a couple of Mandarins), a large family of terrapins and some beautiful black swans. Elsewhere in the complex is an enclosure with peacocks and hens, including some rather exotic white ones.

There is another sanatorium, 'Rainbow', (Ukrainian: Санаторій «Радужний»), within the same grounds as Myrhorod Resort but with different owners. This is, in the main, frequented by wealthy Ukrainians who prefer what they regard as the 'added security' of a sanatorium that advertises itself as 'élite'. The other two resorts are much further out of town, not so well maintained and equipped and are both rather 'tired' in appearance, both from the inside and out. One of them, the 'Hohol', (Ukrainian: Гоголь) is owned by a Trades Union and seems to derive most of its clientele from its members.

Generally, English is not widely spoken in any of the spas, only Ukrainian, although Myrhorod Resort has occasional visitors from the UK, Germany, France, Dubai, the U.S. and Canada in particular and despite very few foreign visitors speaking more than a couple of words of the local languages, they do seem to be able to get by with some pointing, prodding and smiling.

== Notable people ==
- Vladimir Borovikovsky
- Boris Grekov
- Davit Guramishvili
- Vasily Kapnist
- Panas Myrny
- Taras Shevchenko
- Hryhorii Skovoroda
- Mykhailo Voskobiinyk

== Partner towns ==
Since 1991, Myrhorod administration signed international agreements of mutual cooperation in the spheres of economics, commerce, and culture with three foreign partner towns:

- (Bulgaria) Gorna Oryahovitsa (1991)
- (United States) Randolph, Vermont (1999)
- (Poland) Zgorzelec (2007)

== Transport ==
The city is served by the Myrhorod Air Base (IATA: MXR), located at approximately 5 kilometres (3.1 mi) in the south of the center.

== Gallery ==
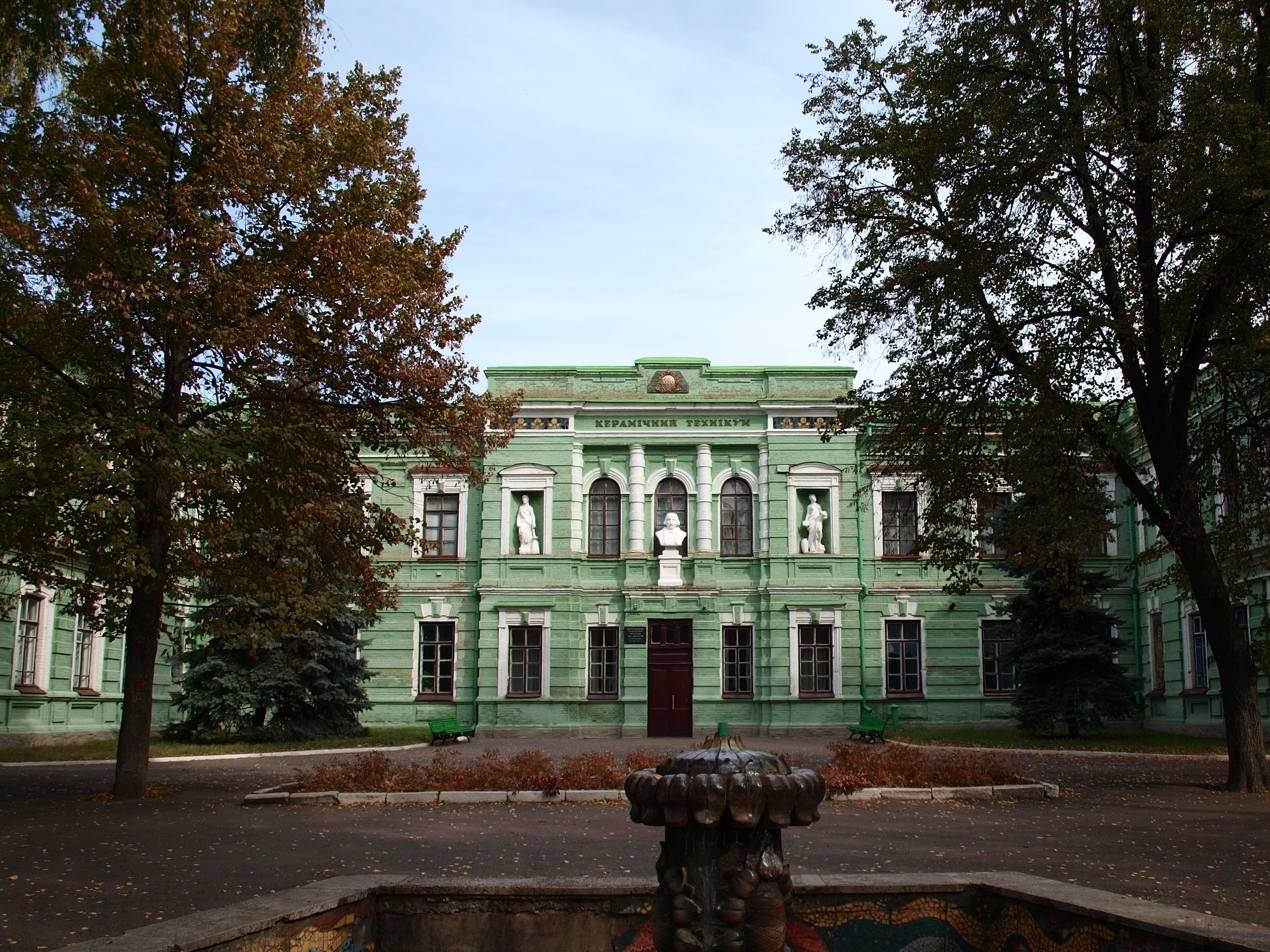
House of Myrhorod Ceramic College

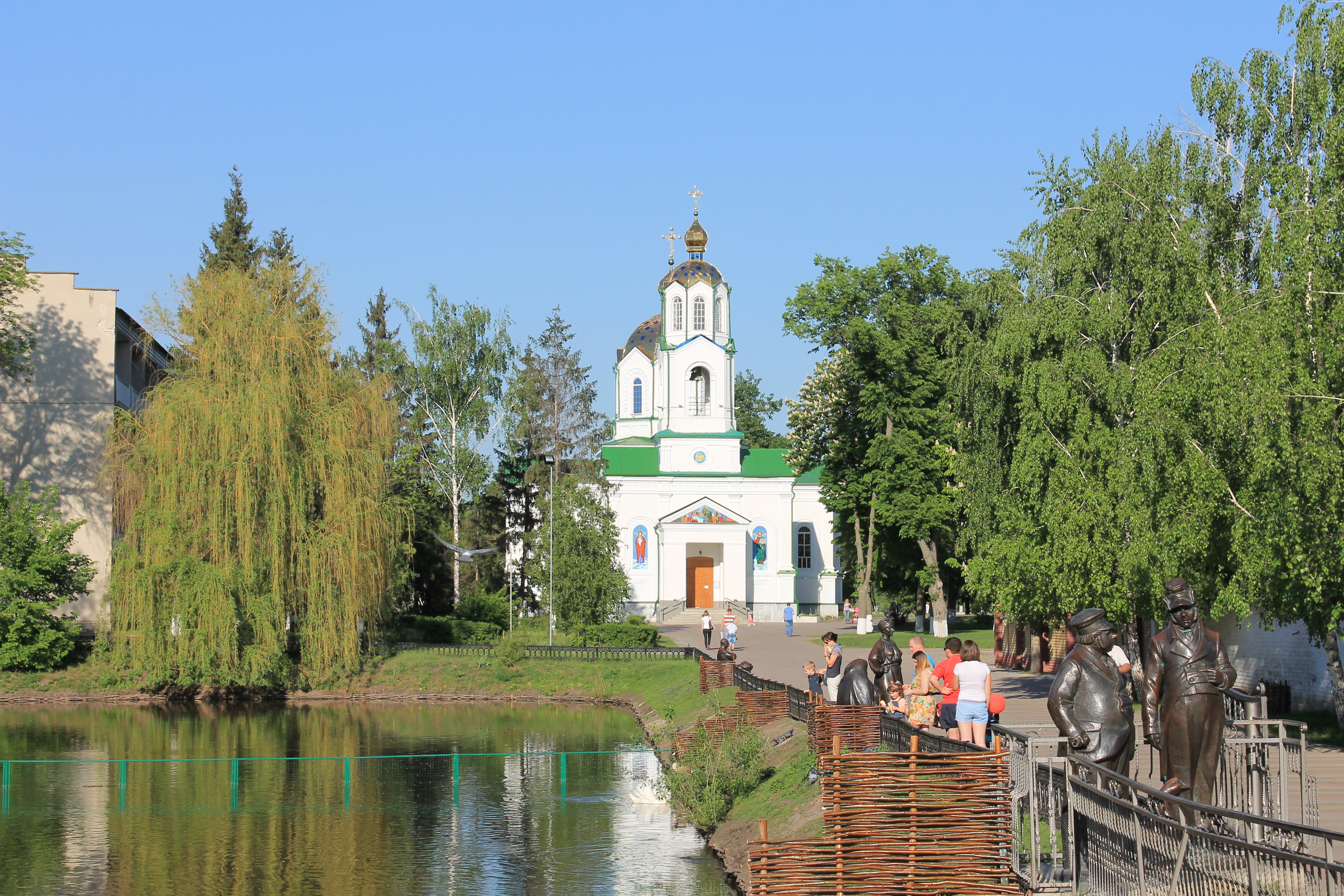
Dormition Church

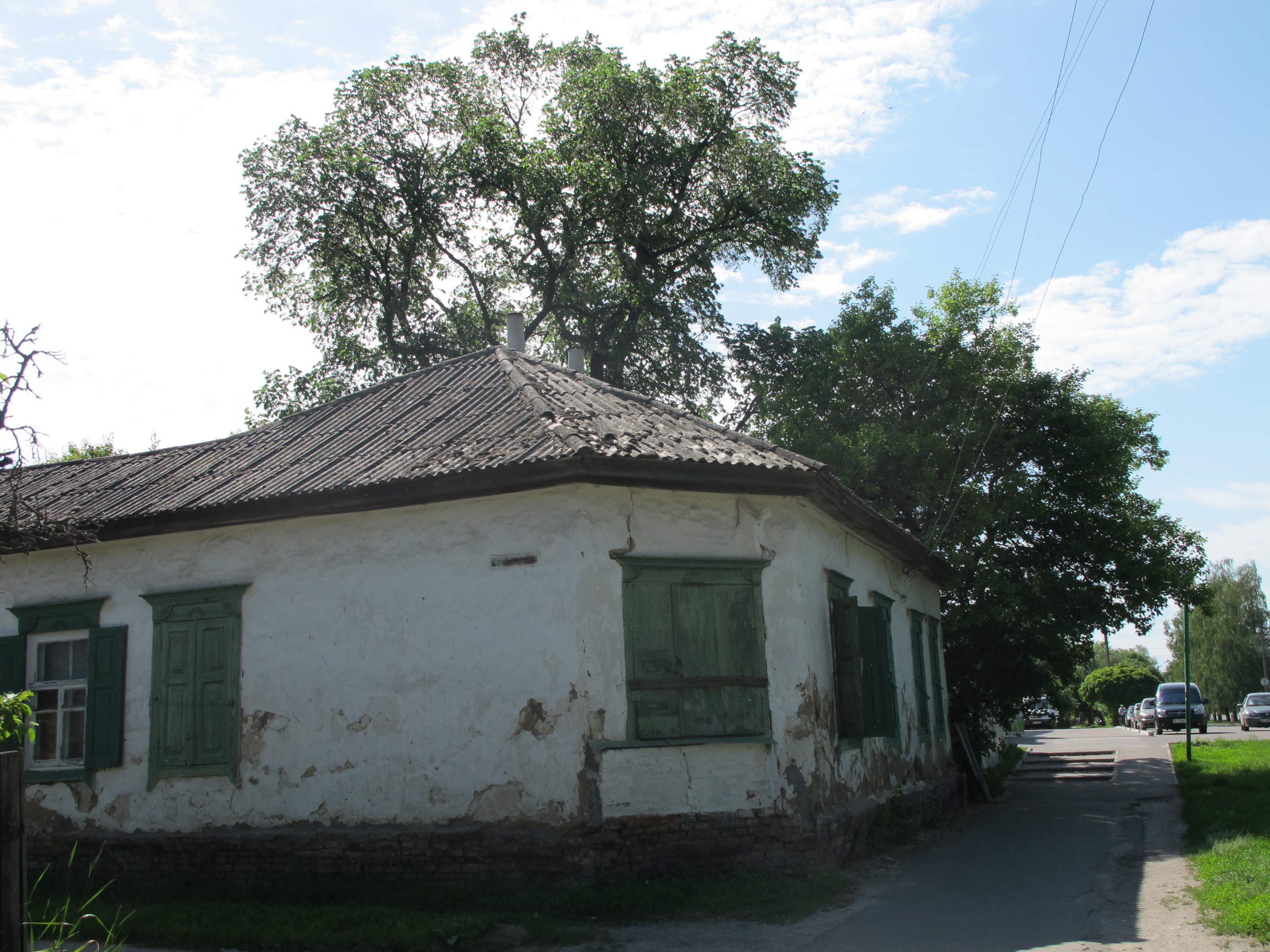
Old house in Myrhorod

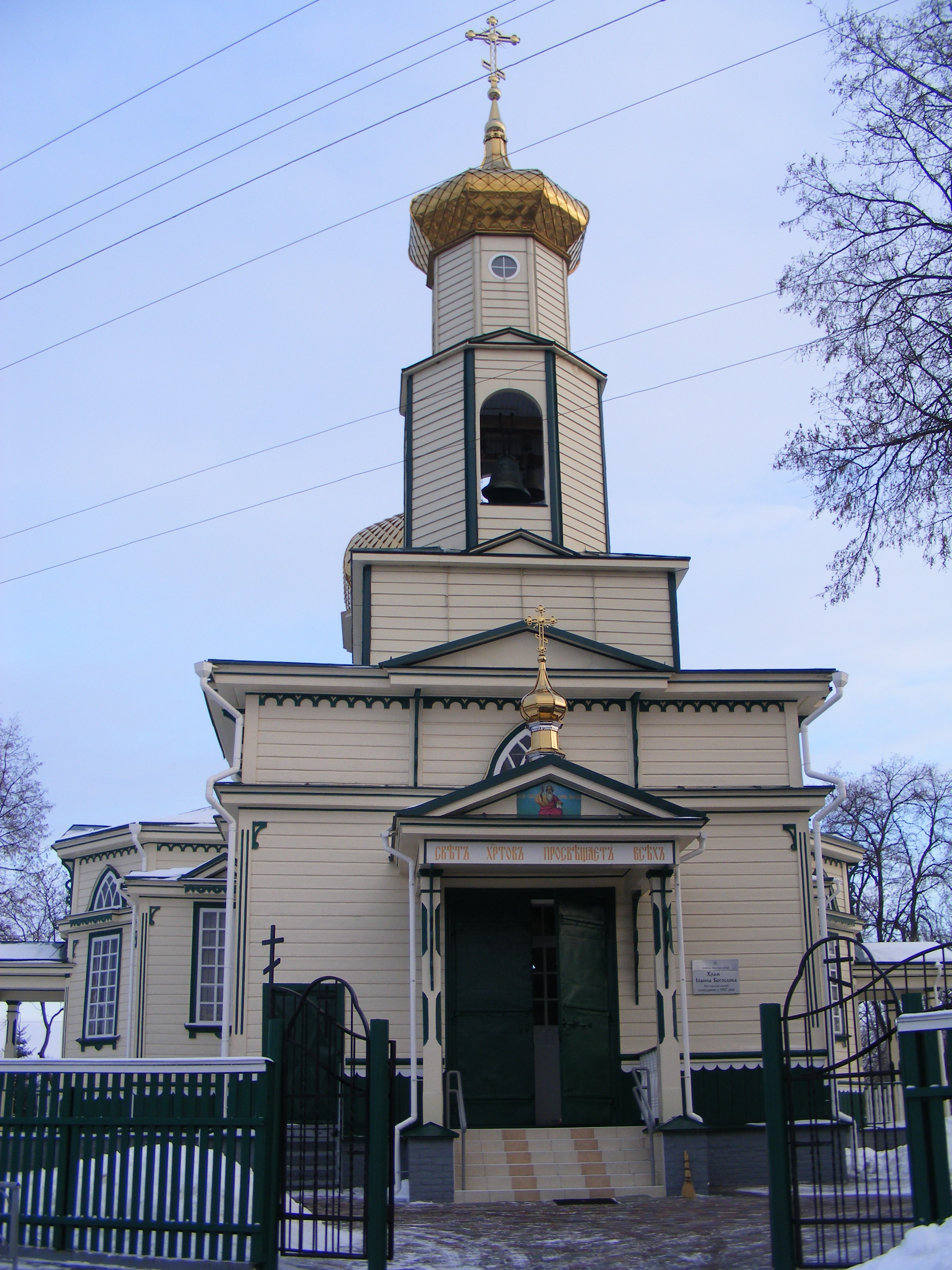
St. John Church, Myrhorod

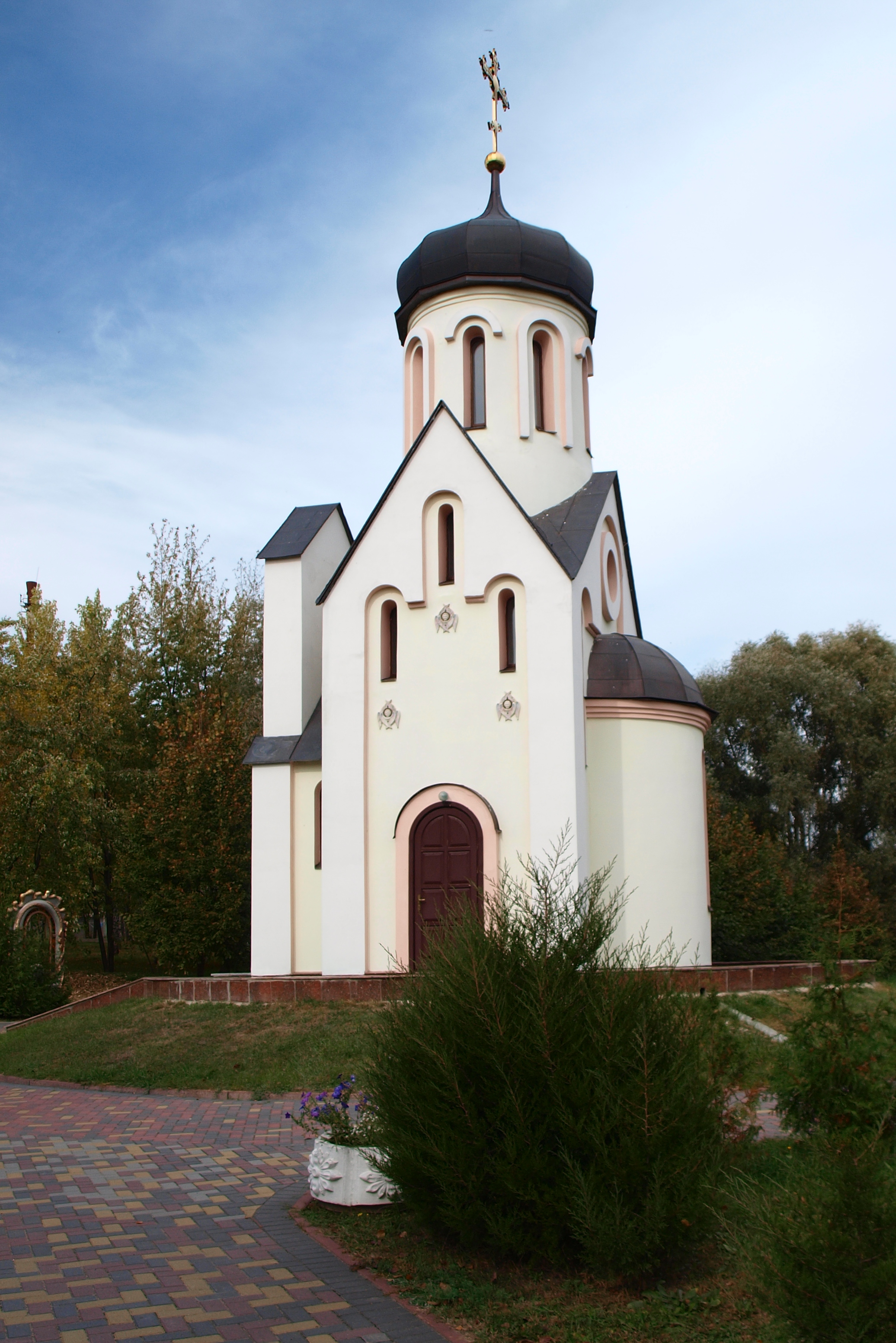
A chapel in Myrhorod

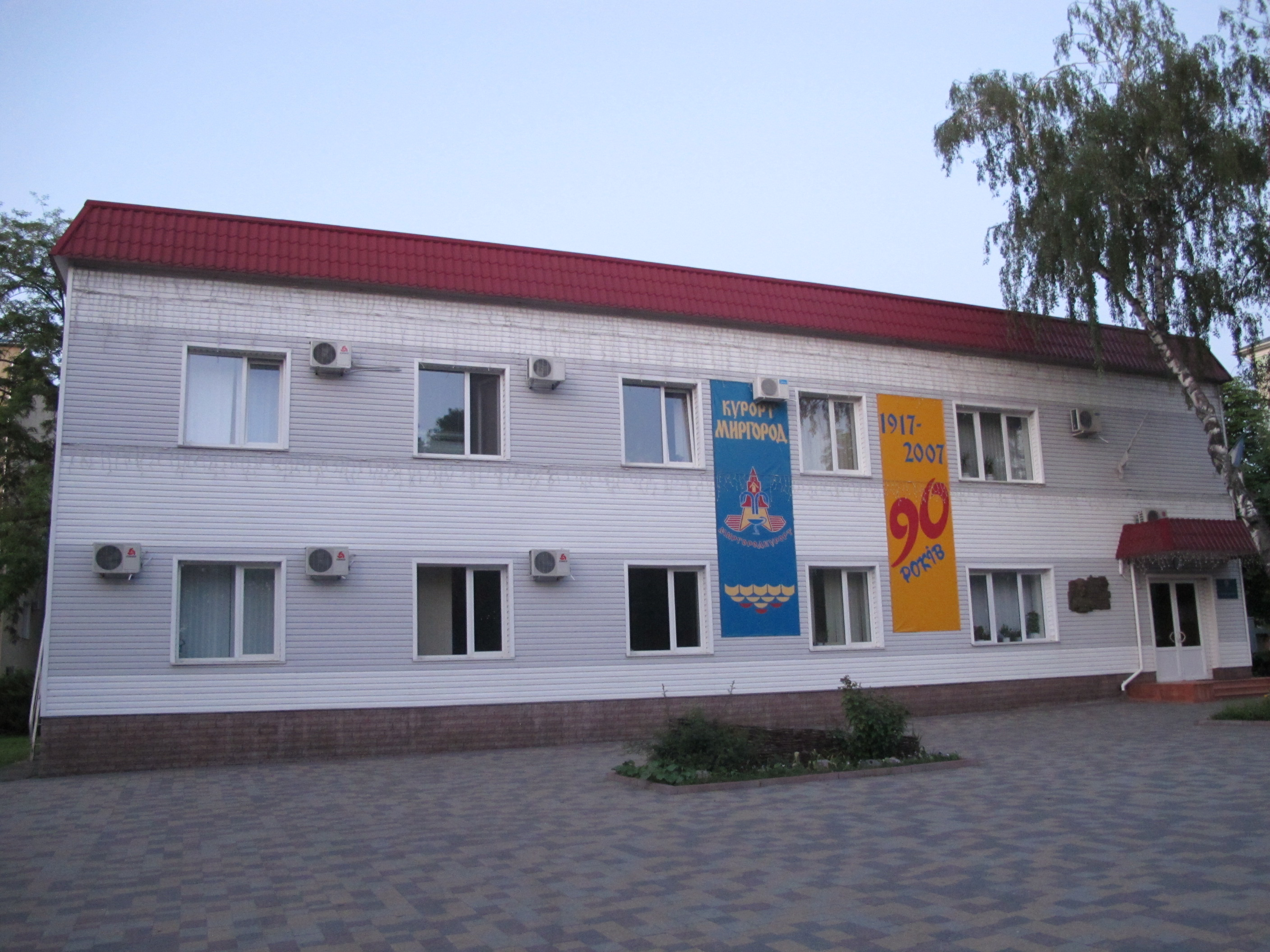
Myrhorod Resort office

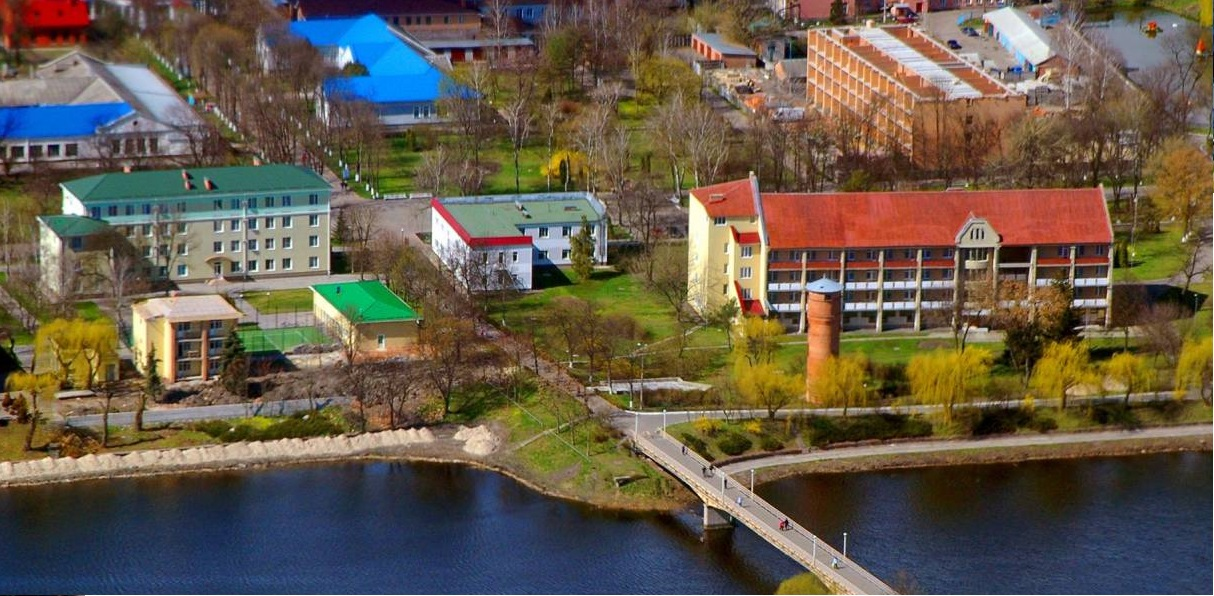
Bird's eye view

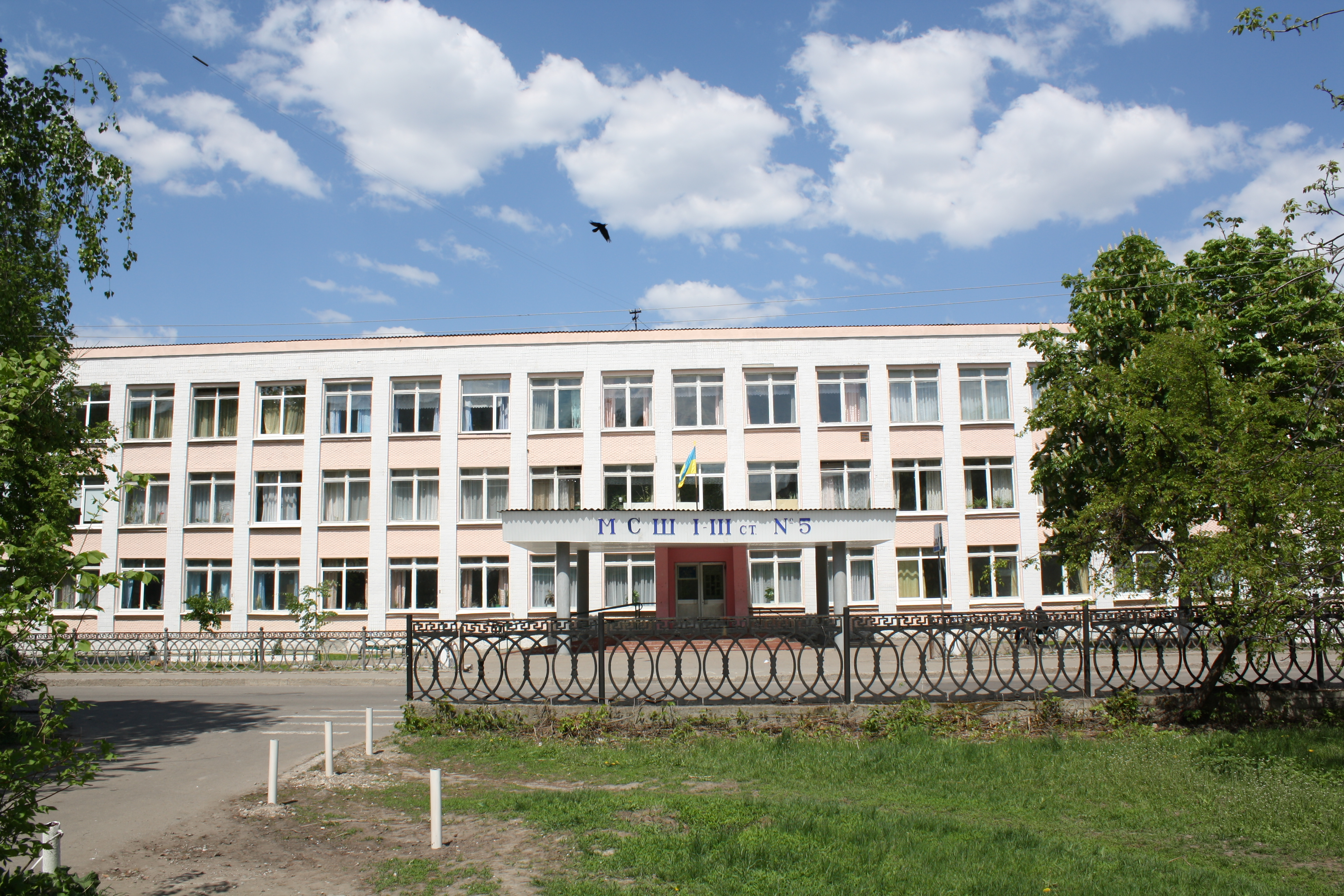
School No.5

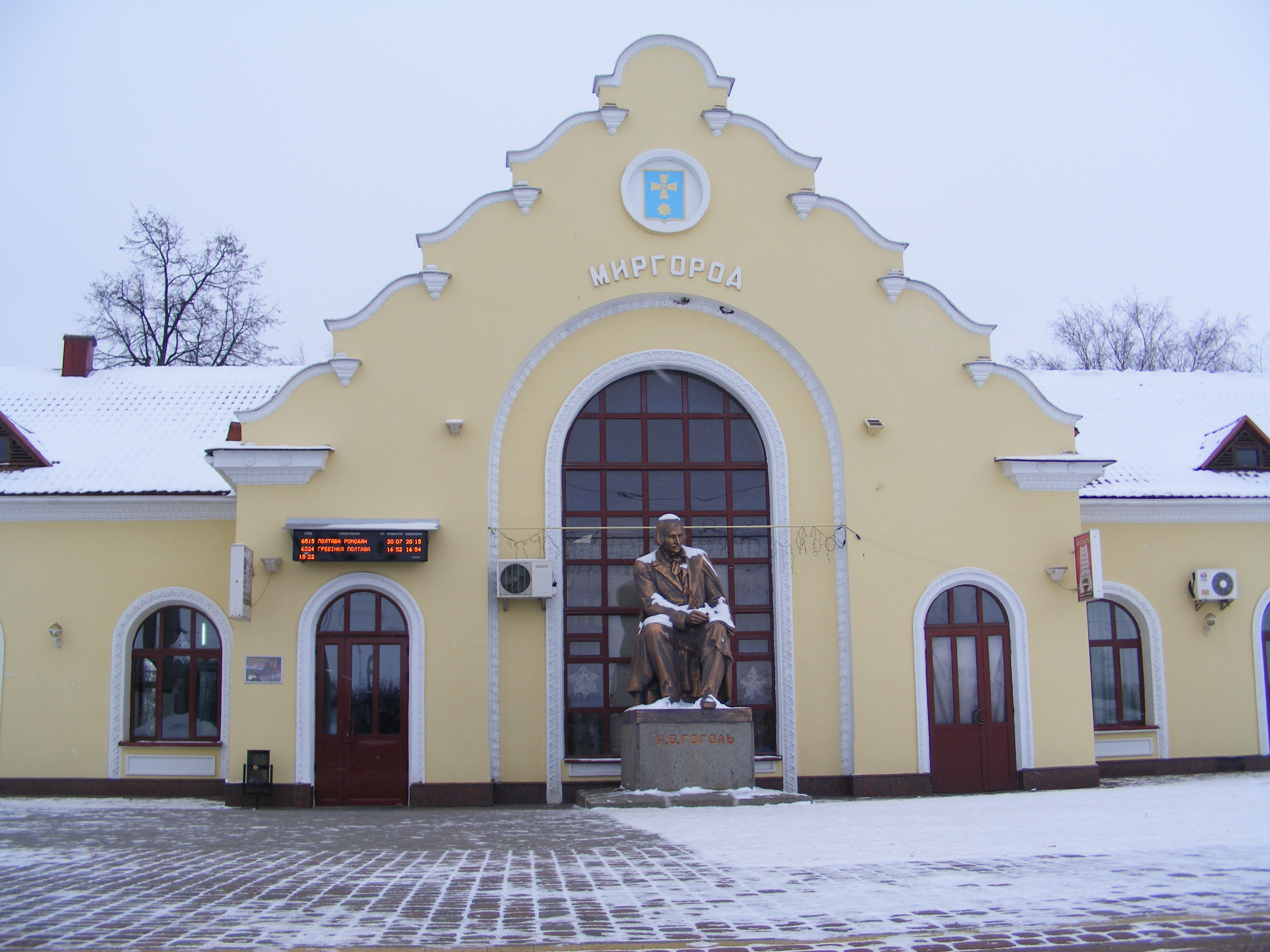
Myrhorod railway station
