= Ave Maria (Bahrianyi) =

1929 poem by Ivan Bahrianyi

- Author: Ivan Bahrianyi
- Language: Ukrainian
- Genre: Poetry
- Publisher: "SAM"; Ukrainian: САМ (Okhtyrka)
- Publication date: 1929
- Publication place: Ukrainian SSR

Ave Maria is a poetry book by Ukrainian poet and writer Ivan Bahrianyi. The work was one of the first to lay the foundations for samizdat (samvydav) among Ukrainian writers.

== Description ==
In the mid-1920s, Bahriyanyi, disappointed with censorship, left Kyiv for Okhtyrka. Later, a small book appeared in Kyiv and other bookstores – the poem "Ave Maria." Bahriyanyi wrote it in the late 1920s, and, unable to circumvent censorship restrictions, published it as a self-made book.

According to the book itself, it was written in 1927 in Sevastopol, Odesa, and Kyiv, and printed in 1929 by the SAM publishing house, which no one had heard of before. The book was printed at the author's own expense. As it turned out later, Bahriyanyi personally arranged for the book to be printed with his acquaintances at the Okhtyrka printing house, and after receiving the print run, he sent it to bookstores. The book Ave Maria was quickly banned and confiscated, but several hundred copies out of 1,200 were still sold.

The book was printed on cheap gray newsprint with a paper cover in the format of a popular brochure. Such a publication without official permission was unprecedented in Soviet conditions. Legends circulated in journalistic and literary circles about this format, invented by Bahriyanyi, which some called a "creative whim." According to historians, in particular Vakhtang Kipiani, this particular publication by Bagriany was one of the first in the Samizdat series, a dissident form of printing and reprinting literary works that developed significantly after the 1950s.

In a scathing article, critic Pravdyuk claimed that "Bahriyanyi sees only one national oppression of Ukraine in all the historical processes of the 17th–18th centuries.

Bahriyanyi did not hide his anti-Soviet sentiments, which could be seen, in particular, in the historical novel Skelska and the poem Ave Maria. According to the Soviet authorities, with the help of the book Ave Maria, along with the historical novel Skielka, the poems Shadow, Vendée, Gutenberg, and the social satire The Whip, the 23-year-old poet Bahriyanyi was engaged in "counterrevolutionary agitation."

In the preface to the book, the author wrote: “Having hit a wall painted in the beautiful color of meanness and rebounding from it, I rolled in the opposite direction. However, I have no regrets — it had to be this way”.
