= Ihor Kostetskyi =

Ukrainian writer, playwright, translator, literary critic and publisher

- Born: 14 May 1913; Kyiv, Ukraine, Russian Empire
- Died: 14 June 1983 (aged 70); Schwaikheim, West Germany
- Occupation(s): Writer, playwright, translator, literary critic and publisher

Ihor Kostezkyj (Ukrainian: Ігор Костецький), also known by the pen name Iwan Mersljakow (Ukrainian: Іван В’ячеславович Мерзляков), was a Ukrainian writer, playwright, translator, literary critic and publisher.

== Career ==
Born on 14 May 1913 (1 May 1913 O.S.) in Kyiv, Russian Empire, Kostetskyj grew up in his Kyiv and Vinnytsia. During the 1930s, he studied stage directing and acting in Leningrad and Moscow, spending two years as an actor in the Ural Mountains. Kostetskyj began his literary career at this time authoring Russian-language reviews of theatrical performances; his first publication, signed with his pen name incorporating his mother's maiden name, was written in Vinnytsia in 1941. In the early 1940s, following the outbreak of the Second World War, he returned to the German-occupied Vinnytsia and lived there until the autumn of 1942, when he was deported to Germany for forced labor. Kostetskyj continued an active literary career in the displaced persons camps after the war in West Germany, continuing to write and publish works in a combined traditional and modernist style, briefly publishing a short-lived artistic and literary journal, and becoming one of the founders of the Artistic Ukrainian Movement (MUR, Ukrainian: Мисте́цький Украї́нський Рух).

From 1949 to 1969, Kostetskyj was the editor of Ukraine and the World (Ukrainian: Україна і Світ, Ukraïna i svit), a journal of cultural, literary, scholarly, and political affairs published by Ilia Sapiha in Hannover, West Germany. With his wife, German poet and translator Elisabeth Kottmeier, Kostetskyj established the Na Hori (Ukrainian: На горі On the Mountain) publishing house in the mid-1950s, publishing several dozen of books including Ukrainian translations of literary classics.

== Notable works ==
- Tales about the Victors (1946)
- There, Where the Miracle Begins (1948)
- Soviet Theater Policy and Stanislavsky's System (1956)
- The Theater on Your Doorstep (1963)
- The Whole World Belongs to You (2005) [posthumously published]
