= Myrhorod urban hromada =

Urban hromada of Poltava Oblast, Ukraine

Myrhorod urban hromada Миргородська міська громада
- Hromada
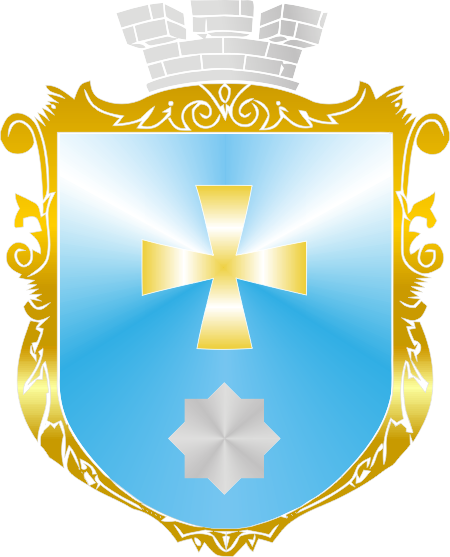
- Seal

- Location within Poltava Oblast Location within Ukraine
- Coordinates: 49°57′57″N 33°36′41″E
- Country: Ukraine
- Oblast (province): Poltava Oblast
- Raion (district): Myrhorod Raion

Area
  - Total: 632.1 km^{2} (244.1 sq mi)

Population (2023)
  - Total: 57,592
- Website: myrgorod.pl.ua

Myrhorod urban territorial hromada (Ukrainian: Миргородська міська територіальна громада, romanized: Myrhorodska miska terytorialna hromada) is one of the hromadas of Ukraine, located in Myrhorod Raion within Poltava Oblast. Its administrative centre is the city of Myrhorod.

The hromada has a total area of 632.1 km^{2} (244.1 mi^{2}), as well as a population of 57,592 (as of 2023).

== Composition ==
In addition to one city (Myrhorod), the hromada includes 36 villages:

- Bieeve
- Bilyky
- Derkachi
- Dibrivka
- Dovhalivka
- Harkushyntsi
- Hlyboke
- Khomutets
- Kotliari
- Kybyntsi
- Kuzmenky
- Leshchenky
- Liubivshchyna
- Mali Sorochyntsi
- Maltsi
- Malynivka
- Marchenky
- Mylashenkove
- Nosenky
- Osove
- Petrivtsi
- Pokazove
- Ruda
- Rybalske
- Shakhvorostivka
- Shapkove
- Slobidka
- Stovbyne
- Trudoliub
- Verkhovyna
- Vesele
- Vovnianka
- Yarmaky
- Yemtsi
- Yerky
- Zubivka
