= Ivan Bahrianyi =

Ukrainian writer and politician (1906–1963)

Ivan Bahrianyi Shevchenko National Prize laureate
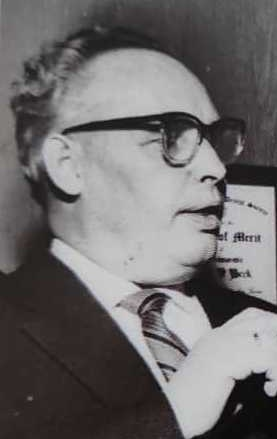
- Ivan Bahrianyi, after 1954
- Born: Ivan Pavlovych Lozoviaha; 2 October 1906; Kuzemyn, Kharkov Governorate, Russian Empire
- Died: 25 August 1963 (aged 56); Sankt Blasien, West Germany
- Occupations: writer, translator
- Writing career
- Language: Ukrainian
- Genres: Prose, poetry, pamphlet

Ivan Pavlovych Bahrianyi (Note: Ukrainian: Іван Павлович Багряний, Russian: Иван Павлович Багряный) (né Lozoviaha, Lozoviahin; 2 October 1906 – 25 August 1963) was a Ukrainian writer, essayist, novelist, and politician. His literary works were banned in the Soviet Union, and only became widely known to readers in Ukraine following the country's independence. In 1992, Bahrianyi was posthumously awarded the Shevchenko National Prize in literature for his novels Garden of Gethsemane and Tiger Trappers.

== Biography ==
=== Early years ===
Ivan Bahrianyi was born in the village of Kuzemyn, Kharkov Governorate, Russian Empire, to the family of a bricklayer. He could not receive education consistently due to difficult living conditions during World War I, the Russian Revolution, and the post-war chaos. At the age of six, he started in parochial school. Later, Bahrianyi finished higher elementary school in Okhtyrka. Having completed his secondary education in 1920, he entered a locksmith school before being admitted to an artistic school. That same year, he witnessed the murders of his grandfather and uncle.

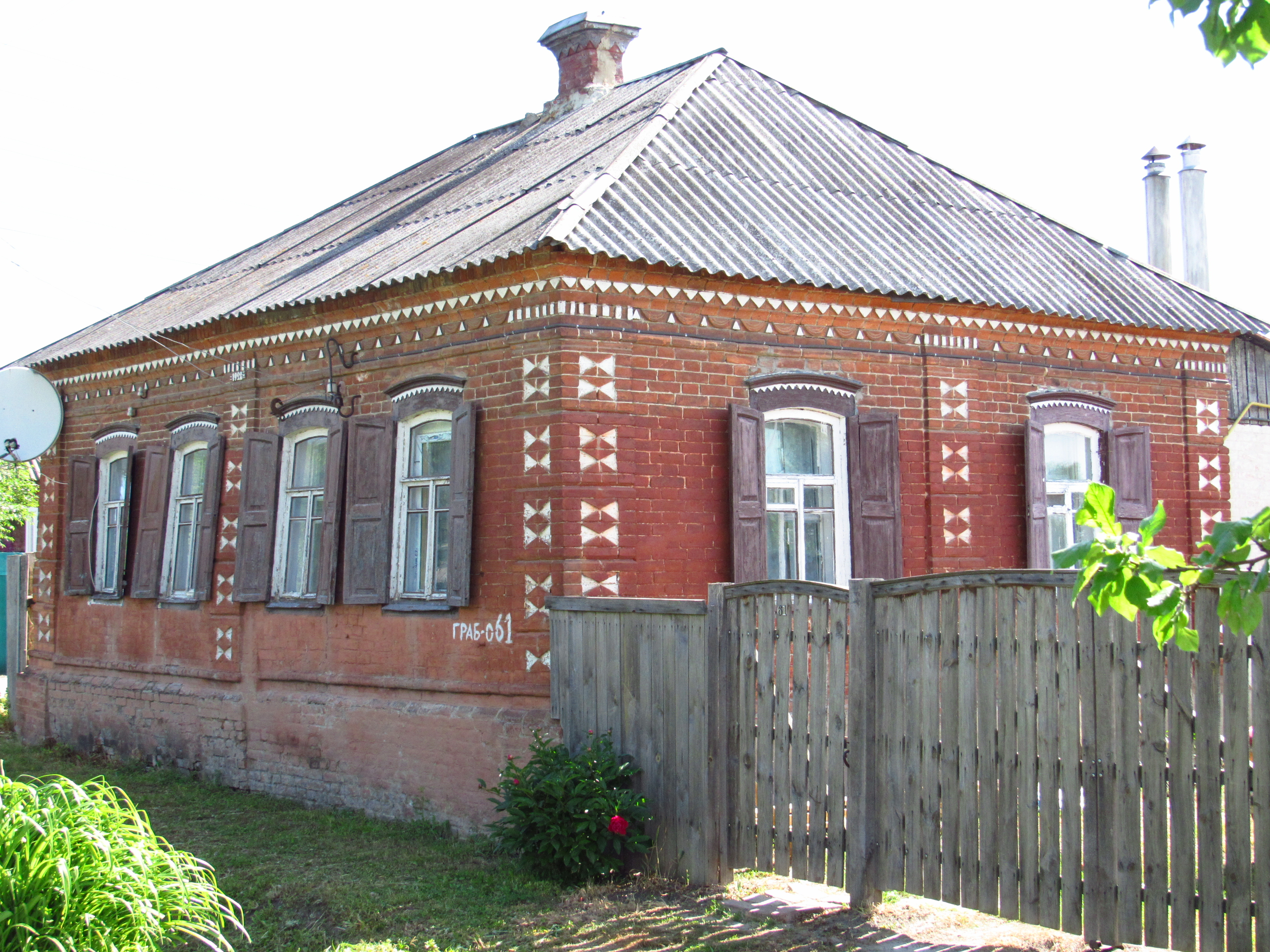
Bahrianyi's childhood home in Okhtyrka

"I was just a 10-year-old boy when the Bolsheviks invaded my mind as a bloody nightmare, appearing as the executioners of my people. This was in 1920. At the time, I lived with my grandfather in a village on a beekeeping farm. My grandfather was 92 years old and had lost an arm. Then, one evening, some armed men speaking a foreign language came. Right in front of my eyes and those of my cousins, they tortured him to death while we screamed in terror. They also killed one of his sons — my uncle.

They killed my grandfather because he was a wealthy Ukrainian farmer (he owned 40 hectares of land) and opposed 'the commune.' They killed my uncle because, during the national liberation struggle of 1917–18, he was a soldier in the Ukrainian National Republic Army. He fought for the freedom and independence of his people."

— Ivan Bahrianyi, Why I Am Not Going Back to the Soviet Union

In 1922, a period of work and active social and political life began: he was deputy chief of a sugar mill, then a district political inspector at the Okhtyrka police, and a drawing teacher in a colony for the homeless and orphans. At that time, he visited Donbas, Crimea, and Kuban. Bahrianyi entered the Kyiv Art Institute but did not graduate due to material distress and the prejudiced attitude of the management. Due to the fact that he spoke the Ukrainian language and was a Ukrainian-spirited young man, his peers mocked him. They called him Mazepian (a Russian derogatory term for Ukrainians after Ivan Mazepa, similar to modern Banderites), which may have been one of the reasons for his joining the Organization of Ukrainian Nationalists (OUN) in the future.

During the Russian Civil War and later in the early 1920s, Bahrianyi was involved in Soviet social and political work but he left Komsomol in 1925. In 1926, he began to publish poetry in newspapers and journals, and his first published collection of poetry appeared in 1927. In 1929, he published Ave Maria, a collection of poems that was almost immediately banned by censorship and removed from the book trade. Bahrianyi was a member of the Association of Young Writers in Kyiv, also known the Workshop of Revolutionary Word (MARS), where he met such writers as Valerian Pidmohylny, Yevhen Pluzhnyk, Borys Antonenko-Davydovych, Hryhory Kosynka, Teodosiy Osmachko, and others who were criticized and repressed by official Soviet authorities. In 1930, Bahrianyi's historical novel Skelka, written in verse, was published. It tells of the uprising in the village of Skelka in the 18th century against the arbitrariness of the Moscow monks of the monastery near the village. The peasants burned down the monastery in protest against national oppression.

=== Arrest and detention ===
On 16 April 1932, Bahrianyi was arrested in Kharkiv for “counter-revolutionary propaganda” he allegedly had spread in his poems. He spent 11 months in solitary confinement in the OGPU prison. On 25 October 1932, he was "released" from prison, banned from Ukraine, and sentenced to 3 years of forced labor camp in the Khabarovsk region in the Russian Far East. He tried to escape but was unsuccessful, and his sentence was extended by 3 years.

Bahrianyi was then transferred to another camp, Bamlag. The exact date of his release is unknown. On 16 June 1938, he was re-arrested and placed in Kharkiv NKVD jail for “nationalist counter-revolutionary organization." Bahrianyi was charged with participating in and even leading the nationalist counter-revolutionary organization. On 1 April 1940 the prosecution failed to convict Bahrianyi after he refused to sign a confession. It was ruled that Bahrianyi was already prosecuted for his activity and the case was dismissed. Bahrianyi returned to Okhtyrka. Later, he used his autobiographical details in his 1946 novel Tiger Trappers (Tyhrolovy) and 1950 novel Garden of Gethsemane (Sad Hetsymans'kyi).

=== World War II years ===
Before World War II Bahriany was working in the Okhtyrka theater "Narodnyi Dim." After Okhtyrka was overrun by the German Army at the onset of World War II, Bahrianyi was arrested for his anti-fascist messages in the theater's curtain design. He escaped from prison after two months, joining a Ukrainian nationalist underground organization, and later relocated to Galicia.

Bahrianyi worked in the OUN propaganda sector, writing patriotic songs and articles, as well as drawing cartoons and propaganda posters. He also helped to establish the Ukrainian Supreme Liberation Council (USLC) and contributed to drafting its founding documents. Simultaneously, he resumed his literary activities. Bahrianyi published his novel Tyhrolovy (translated as Tiger Trappers or The Hunters and the Hunted in English) and the poem Huliaipole in 1944. Before Nazi Germany's defeat in 1945, Bahrianyi moved to West Germany with the help of OUN.

=== Emigration ===
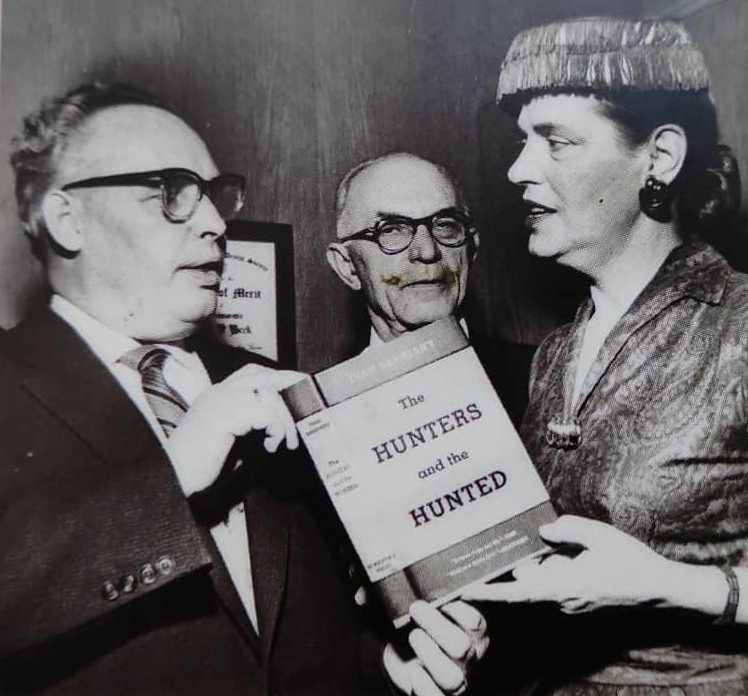
Bahriany hands a copy of the Tiger Trappers to Mary Beck.

After the end of World War II, under a 1939 agreement, all former citizens were to return to Soviet Ukraine. Bahrianyi, who had settled in displaced persons camp in Neu-Ulm, Germany wrote a pamphlet that had a massive impact on ex-Ostarbeiter and prisoners of war, Why I Am Not Going Back to the Soviet Union. The pamphlet presented the Soviet Union as an "evil stepmother" that staged a genocide of its own people. Ukrainian commemorative writing credits the pamphlet with shaping Eleanor Roosevelt's position on forcible repatriation at the United Nations, and thereby with the adoption of the Universal Declaration of Human Rights. The historian Marta Dyczok, however, attributes the Ukrainian material circulated to United Nations delegates by Roosevelt to a different publication, "The plight of Ukrainian DPs".

In 1947 Bahrianyi organized the first foreign translation of George Orwell's Animal Farm.

In 1948, he founded the Ukrainian Revolutionary Democratic Party (URDP). From 1948 until his death in 1963, he edited the newspaper Ukrains'ki visti (Ukrainian News). He headed the Ukrainian National Council's executive committee and also performed the duties of the Deputy President of the Ukrainian People's Republic in exile.

The novel "A Man Runs Over the Abyss” was written in 1948-1949 and published. The novel was a harsh critique of Bolshevism and sought to expose lies of the Soviet Union.

Bahrianyi became a major organizing force in the Ukrainian émigré writers' community. He founded a group known as the Ukrainian Art Movement (MUR).. This movement would be responsible for publishing thousands of articles. The MUR held three congresses in 1945, 1947 and 1948. Literary and artistic themes focused on modernization and the diaspora of Ukrainian culture.

While in emigration, Bahrianyi took an active part in the political life of Ukrainian diaspora, leading the Ukrainian Revolutionary Democratic Party and working as chief editor of its press organ Ukrainski Visti. He also headed the executive of Ukrainian National Council and served as deputy president of the Ukrainian People's Republic in exile.

Bahrianyi's writings brought to him the attention of Soviet KGB, which made several attempts to recruit the author as its agent abroad, trying to influence his position by employing his wife, son and other relatives, who stayed in the USSR. After Bahrianyi's refusal, Soviet secret police attempted to discredit him in the eyes of Ukrainian diaspora by spreading false claims about his cooperation with the Communist regime. During the late 1950s, KGB developed a plan to eliminate the writer with the employment of its agent Bohdan Stashynskyi. According to Bahrianyi's friends, during his latter years he had a cianide pill mounted into his jacket, which he could use in order to commit suicide in case of being apprehended by KGB operatives.

In 1963, the Democratic Union of Ukrainian Youth based in Chicago started an action to support awarding Bahrianyi with the Nobel Prize. However, his sudden death prevented him from being formally nominated for the award, which is not awarded posthumously.

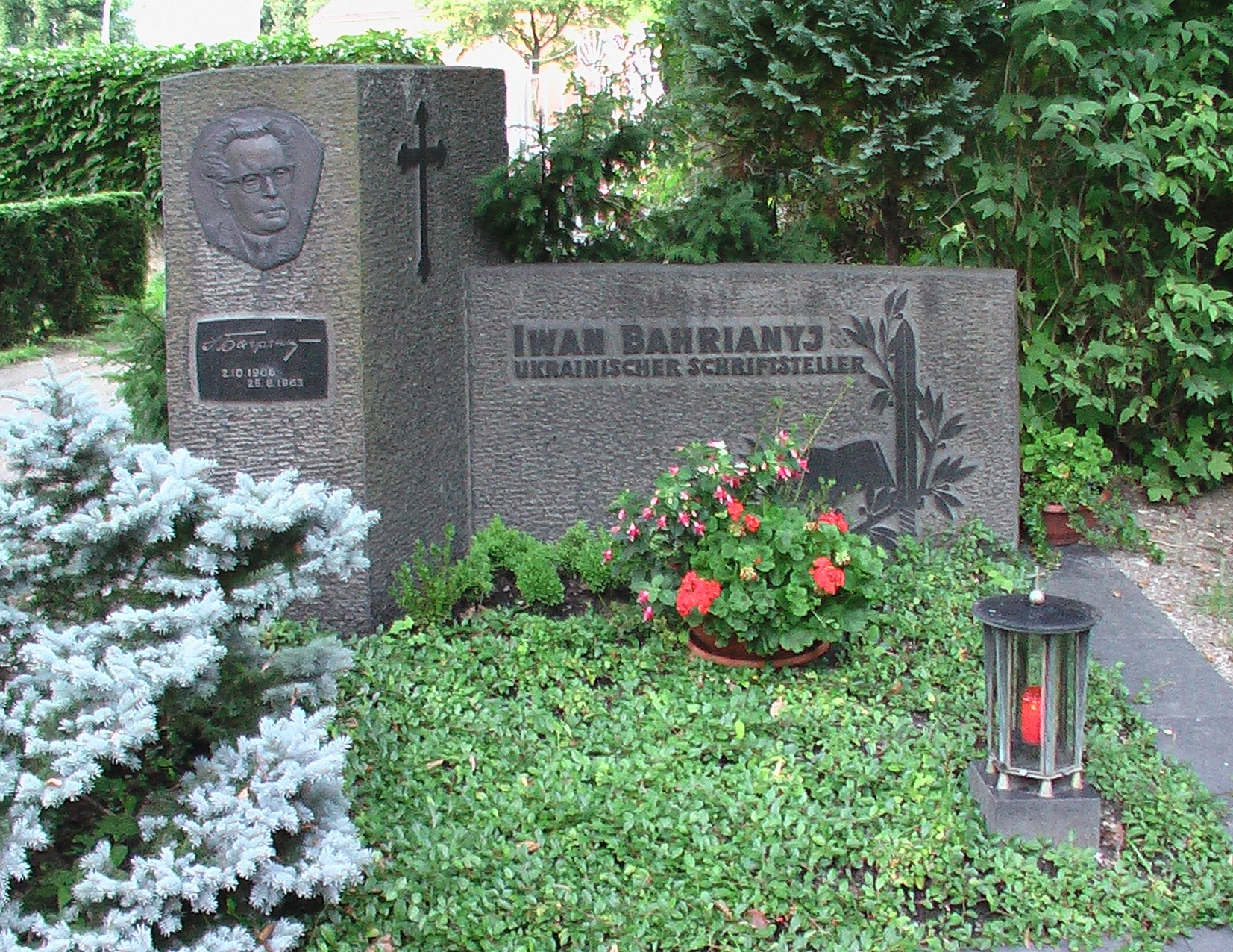
Bahrianyi's tomb in Neu Ulm, Germany

=== Illness and death ===
Suffering from a lung condition, around the early 1950s Bahrianyi had to undergo surgery. His health, already weakened by years spent in imprisonment and exile, additionally suffered due to stress as a result of continuing provocations by the KGB. Starting from 1955, the writer was unable to leave his bed, and a special construction had to be installed, allowing him to write in a lying position. Bahrianyi died on 25 August 1963. He was buried in Neu-Ulm, Bavaria, West Germany.

== Family ==
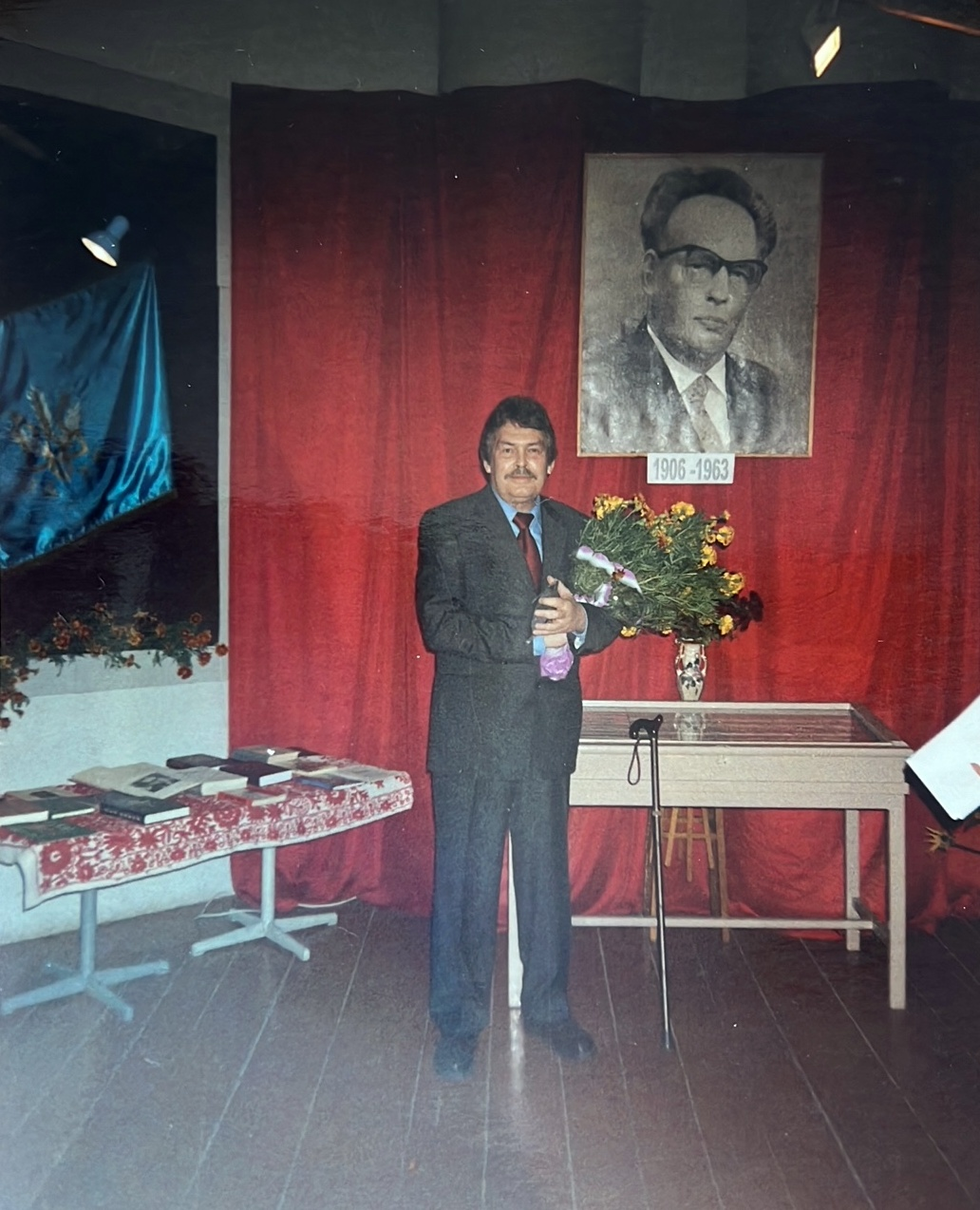
Bahrianyi's son Nestor in front of his father's portrait in Okhtyrka

Bahrianyi was married twice; his first wife was Antonina Zosimova, and they had two children: a son, Boris, and a daughter, Natasha. In exile, he married again to Halyna Tryhub (born in Ternopil). They also had two children: son Nestor and daughter Roksolana.

== Legacy ==
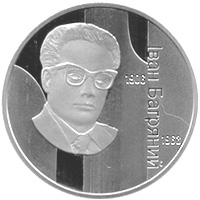
Coin of Ukraine with the image of Bahrianyi

In the Soviet Union Bahrianyi was strongly criticized by the press as a "bourgeois nationalist". His works became popularized among the broad audience only during the late 1980s. In 1992, Bahrianyi posthumously received the Shevchenko Prize (Ukrainian: Шевченківська премія) for his novels Tyhrolovy and Sad Hetsymanskyi. On 13 July 2023, Pushkin Park in Kyiv was renamed Ivan Bahrianyi Park.

== Works ==
=== Stories ===
- Etude (Ukrainian: Етюд, 1921)

=== Novellas and tales ===
- Defeat (1948), a novella
- The Fiery Circle (Neu Ulm, 1953)

=== Novels ===
- Skelka (Ukrainian: Скелька, Kharkiv, 1929), a novella in verse
- Zvirolovy (Trappers, Lviv-Kraków, 1944) and Tyhrolovy (Tiger Trappers, published in English as The Hunters and the Hunted, Neu Ulm, 1946)
- Sad Hetsymanskyi (Ukrainian: Сад Гетсиманський, Garden of Gethsemane, Neu Ulm, 1950)
- Marusia Bohuslavka, the first book of the novel Wild Wind (Munich, 1957)
- A Man Runs Over an Abyss (published posthumously, Neu Ulm-New York, 1965)

=== Poems ===
- Mongolia (Ukrainian: Монголія) (1927)
- Ave Maria (Kharkiv, 1928)
- Huliaipole (Ukrainian: Гуляй-Поле)
- The Phone (1956), a poem for children
- In the Sweat of the Forehead (Ukrainian: В поті чола, 1929), a collection of poems that was prohibited for publication by censorship
- The Golden Boomerang (Ukrainian: Золотий бумеранґ, 1946, a collection of poems

=== Plays ===
- Lilac (Ukrainian: Бузок)
- The General (Ukrainian: Генерал, 1947)
- Morituri (Ukrainian: Морітурі, 1947)

=== Articles ===
- Why I Am Not Going Back to the Soviet Union (1946), a pamphlet

=== Unknown ===
- Mother Tongue
- Shots in the Taiga
