= Ukrainian Revolutionary Democratic Party =

Political party in the Ukrainian diaspora

Ukrainian Revolutionary Democratic Party Українська революційно-демократична партія
- Abbreviation: URDP
- Founded: August 1947
- Split from: Organisation of Ukrainian Nationalists (partially)
- Ideology: Revolutionary socialism; Ukrainian nationalism; Anti-Sovietism
- Political position: Left-wing

The Ukrainian Revolutionary Democratic Party (Ukrainian: Українська революційно-демократична партія, romanized: Ukrainska revoliutsiino-demokratychna partiia), known from 1990 as the Ukrainian Democratic Republican Party, was a socialist political party active in the Ukrainian diaspora following the Second World War. The founders of the URDP were: Ivan Bahrianyi, Hryhoriy Kostyuk, Ivan Maistrenko, Borys Levitsky, Semen Pidhainy, and others. They published Vpered (Forward) edited by Ivan Maistrenko.

== History ==
The Ukrainian Revolutionary Democratic Party was founded in August 1947 in Regensburg, Germany. The party brought together former members of the Organisation of Ukrainian Nationalists and nationally conscious intellectuals. It was first headed by Hryhoriy Kostyuk, who left in 1948 with a left-wing group (Ivan Maistrenko, Borys Levitsky, Roman Paladiychuk, etc.), which formed a left-wing URDP around the Vpered magazine.

For the longest time, the URDP was headed by its main leader and inspirer, Ivan Bahrianyi (1948–1963); further Fedor Haienko (1963–1967), for a short time Mykola Stepanenko (who also left in 1967, creating a separate - "right" URDP), Vasyl Hryshko (1967–1975) and since 1975 - Mykhailo Voskobiinyk.

The program principles of the URDP are based on the struggle against the Soviet regime and the creation of an independent Ukrainian state with a democratic system.

The URDP was a co-founder and active participant in the activities of the Ukrainian National Council until 1968, and, alongside the OUN and Ukrainian National Democratic Alliance, partook in the 1971 Congress of Ukrainian Free Political Thought, at which it was recognised to support the dissident Sixtier movement and accept the existence of the Ukrainian Soviet Socialist Republic as legitimate.

URDP activists initiated the formation of the following organizations: the Association of Former Repressed Ukrainians by the Soviet Regime, the Legion of Symon Petliura, and the Association of Democratic Ukrainian Youth.

Printed publications: "Vpered" (magazine of the left wing of the party), "Ukrainian News", "Ukrainian Prometheus", non-periodic magazine "Our Positions" (since 1948).

The URDP maintains offices in Argentina, Australia, Belgium, Canada, Germany, and the United States. Its United Kingdom branch ceased functioning in 2000.
