= Ivan Maistrenko =

Ukrainian revolutionary

Ivan Vasyliovych Maistrenko (Ukrainian: Іва́н Васи́льович Майстре́нко; 1899–1984) was a Ukrainian revolutionary. He became a communist partisan associated with the Borotbists during the Ukrainian Civil War of 1918–1920. He became a journalist and by 1921 was deputy director of the All-Ukrainian Communist Institute of Journalism. As an opponent of Joseph Stalin, he was arrested but survived the gulag becoming a post-war refugee in West Germany. During the Nazi Germany occupation, in 1942 Maisternko was a director of Ukrainian Bandurist Chorus in Kiev.

He was a prominent member of the Ukrainian Revolutionary Democratic Party and edited their anti-Stalinist workers paper Vpered. He also wrote a book Borotbism about the movement of that name.

== Early life and the Ukrainian Civil War ==
Maistrenko was born onn 28 August 1899 in Opishnia, which was then part of the Poltava Governorate of the Russian Empire]. His father descended from Cossacks, and his mother came from a wealthy household. After studying at the local Opishnia Higher Primary School, he attended the teachers' seminary in the area. There, he first became active politically through the underground "Youth Union", which was a revolutionary organization. He was particularly inspired by fellow Ukrainian revolutionary Andrii Zalivchyi. After joining the UPSR, he participate in anti-Hetmanate and anti-German occupation actions in 1918, and was particularly active in the revolutionary underground in Poltava during 1918-1919. He also took part in the resistance against Anton Denikin's White Army.

Following the collapse of the UPSR, he joined the Borotbists. During this time, he was elected head of the Drabynivka village council and a member of Kustivka volost executive committee under Bolshevik rule. In the summer of 1919 he was appointed political commissar of a Borotbist-formed regiment under the Kobeliaky district executive committee, before joining the Ukrainian People's Army (after the Borotbist-formed regiment was incorporated into the army, as they were the main Ukrainian force resisting the White Army in the region). During his brief time with the UNR, he was captured by the White Army in Poltava, but managed to esccape execution. In December 1919, he returned to Kobeliaky and led the district proto-UKP organization, before the UKP officially existed. By early 1920, he was delivering speeches against the Bolsheviks, and advocated for Ukrainian national communism and peasant mobilization.

However, upon the dissolving of the Borotbists in March 1920, he joined the Communist Party of Ukraine (CPbU). This was to allow himself to hold Soviet posts. On 8 April 1920, he was elected secretary of the district executive committee of Kobeliaky. Soon after, by mid to late 1920, he became more disillusioned with thee CPbU policies and heavily disliked the merger, so he formed ties with the federalist opposition within the CPbU led by Ivan Latynsky. On 22 July 1920, he led a mass defection of 22 party members from CPbU to UKP in Kobeliaky, which led to a massive scandal and the Bolshevik authorities labeling Kobeliaky as the most degraded district associated with "subversive Borotbist activity".
