= Cianide =

- Origin: Chicago, Illinois
- Genres: Death metal, death-doom
- Years active: 1989
- Label: Hells Headbangers Records

Cianide is an American death-doom band formed in Chicago in 1989. Their 1992 debut album The Dying Truth is considered by some to be an essential release in the genre. Other albums released by the band include A Descent into Hell and Doom and Destruction, released in 1994 and 1997, respectively. They released an EP titled Dehumanized in 2019. That same year, Dutch Pearce of Decibel wrote: "Only a few bands in the history of extreme metal have ever managed to lay down the heavy sonic destruction like Midwestern death gods Cianide have done." The band's lyrical themes include corpse decomposition. The band's influences include Hellhammer, Celtic Frost, Venom, and Death. The band also released two demo tapes titled Funeral and Second Life.

== Band members ==
- Mike Perun – bass guitar, vocals
- Scott Carroll – guitar
- Jeff Kabella - drums
