= Tiger Trappers =

Book by Ivan Bahrjanyj

- Author: Ivan Bahriany
- Language: Ukrainian
- Genre: Adventure fiction
- Publication date: 1944

Tiger Trappers (Ukrainian: Тигролови, also translated as The Hunters and the Hunted and Tiger Catchers), is an adventure novel with the autobiographical elements from Ivan Bahriany's life, written and published in 1944 as "Animal Catchers" in the Evening Hour magazine in Lviv. The draft of the original text remained in Soviet Ukraine and after Bahriany moved to Germany he completely restored the text from memory in 1944–1946; this restored version was published in 1946 under the name of Tiger Trappers at the Prometheus publishing house in Neu-Ulm. Separate editions of the novel were published abroad in 1946 (Neu-Ulm), 1955 (Detroit), 1970 (New York, abbreviated version), and 1991 (Detroit). The novel has also been translated and published in English (1954), Dutch (1959), German (1961), Russian (1992, abbreviated), and Spanish (2006). American literary critic Walter Gavighurst, in his review entitled "A Touching Story of Political Exile" for the New York Herald Tribune of February 10, 1957, described the novel as: "This eloquent and exciting adventure story is an equally exciting pursuit of political freedom. It is a novel of chivalry and valor, unexpected wild themes in our grubby fiction."

== History of writing and publishing ==
The work is based on autobiographical events: the expulsion of Bahriany to the Far East, in the Gulag. Having escaped from the NKVD escort that transported Gulag prisoners sentenced to their deaths in Siberia, Bahriany lived in the Taiga for almost two years. The novel's main character, Hryhoriy Mnohohrishnyy, absorbed many of the author's character traits

Bahriany composed the work in 14 days while hiding from the Gestapo in Morshyn, in German-occupied Western Ukraine, basing it on his own bitter experience.

The work was first published in 1944 in Lviv magazine "Evening Hour" in an abbreviated form called "Beast Catchers". That same year, at a literary competition in Lviv, the novel was awarded with a prize.

== About the novel ==
=== Title ===
The title of the work is symbolic. Changing it from the original "Beast Catchers" to the Tiger Trappers, Ivan Bahriany emphasized the story's highlights. Tiger is one of the most powerful and dangerous wild animals. The Sirko family, living in unity with the surrounding nature, represents the moral strength of Ukrainian people and their ability to overcome the most difficult circumstances.

=== The plot ===
The storyline of the novel is built around two figures - Hryhoriy and NKVD Major Medvin. Their duel is a struggle of man with the world of darkness. Being an eyewitness, the author, depicts terrible pictures of abuse, humiliation of human dignity, violence and condemnation to oblivion in the hell of concentration camps.

The main hero, a young man, escapes from the echelon of death, raising the spirits of hundreds of other prisoners and giving them hope not for salvation, but for revenge on theirs tormentors. He wanders in the wilderness in search of rescue and a safe place - and rescues a hunter girl from an angry bear, despite being on the verge of death from physical exhaustion. Hryhoriy enjoys the hospitality of the Ukrainian Sirko family from the Green Wedge — and becomes their son, brother and a hunting partner. He falls in love with Natalka, but hides his feelings so as not to put the girl in danger - and finally gives her the happiness of mutual love.

=== Main characters ===
- Hryhoriy Mnohohrishnyy is a young aviation engineer, a descendant of the glorious Ukrainian hetman Demyan Mnohohrishny. Sentenced to 25 years of imprisonment, but escapes from the prison train, jumping into certain death, but refusing to surrender. "Ninety-nine chances against one were that he would die, but he jumped."
- Natalka Sirko — hunts no worse than her father, and catches fish in the river like no other.
- Hryhoriy Sirko — "hard-nosed, lumbering young man", a young, agile hunter committed to male friendship and family.
- Denys Sirko — an unwavering hunter, a true master of the taiga.
- Sirchykha - the hardworking wife of Denis, protects the comfort and warmth in the house.
- NKVS Major Medvin — a "professional tiger catcher" searching gor a fearless and desperate fugitive who has challenged the system itself.

== Reception ==
The output of Bahriany's work caused a certain resonance among foreign critics, and the total circulation of Tiger Trappers in foreign language translations exceeded one million copies. The work itself received overwhelmingly favorable reviews from foreign literary critics. It has been highlighted as a Ukrainian literary classic.

== Translations ==
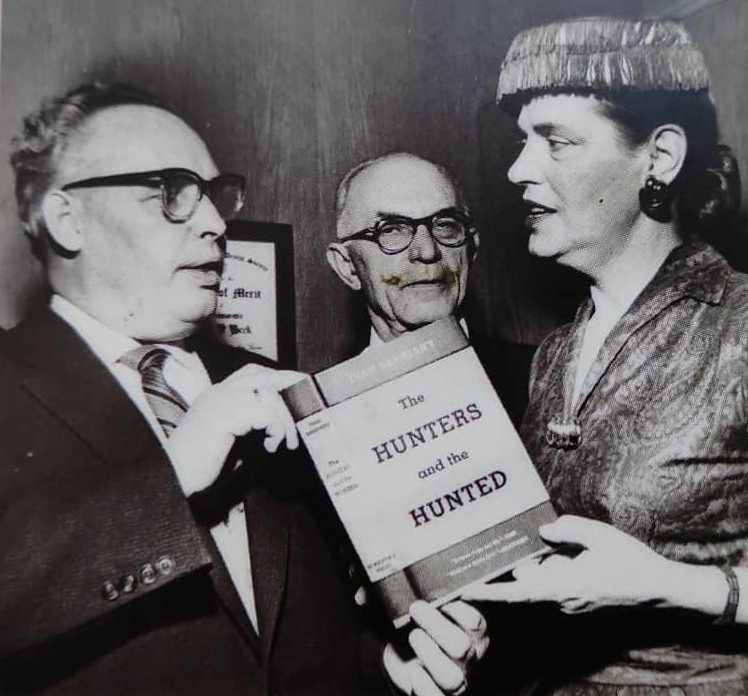
Bahriany handing a copy of the English translation of the novel to Mary Beck

Bahriany's novel Tiger Catchers has been translated into almost all major European languages, including English, Spanish, Dutch and German. Unfortunately, the translations of the novel in the latter two languages were not done directly from the Ukrainian original, but used the English edition of Macmillan.

The translation of the novel into Italian, Danish and other languages was also planned in the late 1950s.

=== List of translations ===
- (English) Ivan Bahrianyi. The Hunters and the Hunted. Translated from the Ukrainian: George S. N. Luckyj or S. Davidovich, A. Gregorovich; foreword: Samuel Beatty. Toronto: Burns & MaCeachern. 1954 270 p.
- (reprint) Ivan Bahriany. The Hunters and the Hunted. Translated from the Ukrainian: George S. N. Luckyj. London: Macmillan; New York: St. Martin's Press. 1956. 244 p. (pdf
- (Dutch). Iwan Bahrjany. Vlucht in de Taiga. Vertalen uit het Engels door: Peter van Wijk. Utrecht: Het Spectrum 1959. 189 p (Prisma-boeken, 392)
- (German) Iwan Bahriany. Das Gesetz der Taiga. Übersetzt von Englisch: Margreth von Kees. Köln/Graz: Verlag Styria. . 255 s. abbreviated version)
- (Russian) Иван Багряный. Тигроловы. Перевод с украинского: Анатолий Горошко; рисунки Н. Байкова. Владивосток: Рубеж — Тихоокеанский альманах, 1992 No. 2 (с. 67–144) (abbreviated version)
- (Spanish) Ivan Bahrianyi. Cazadores de tigres (novela en dos tomos). Traducido al espanol por: Myxailo Vasylyk; correcion: Volodymyr Vasylyk. Buenos Aires: Duken. 2006. 336 p. ISBN 978-987-02-1925-5

== Adaptations ==
A television film was created by Ukrtelefilm on the base of the novel in 1994, with the main roles being played by Oleh Savkin and Olha Sumska. A new Ukrainian film based on the novel is currently in pre-production.

In 2023 a musical based on Bahriany's novel premiered at the National Operetta of Ukraine.
