= Samiilo Velychko =

Ukrainian Cossack noble and historian (1670-1728?)

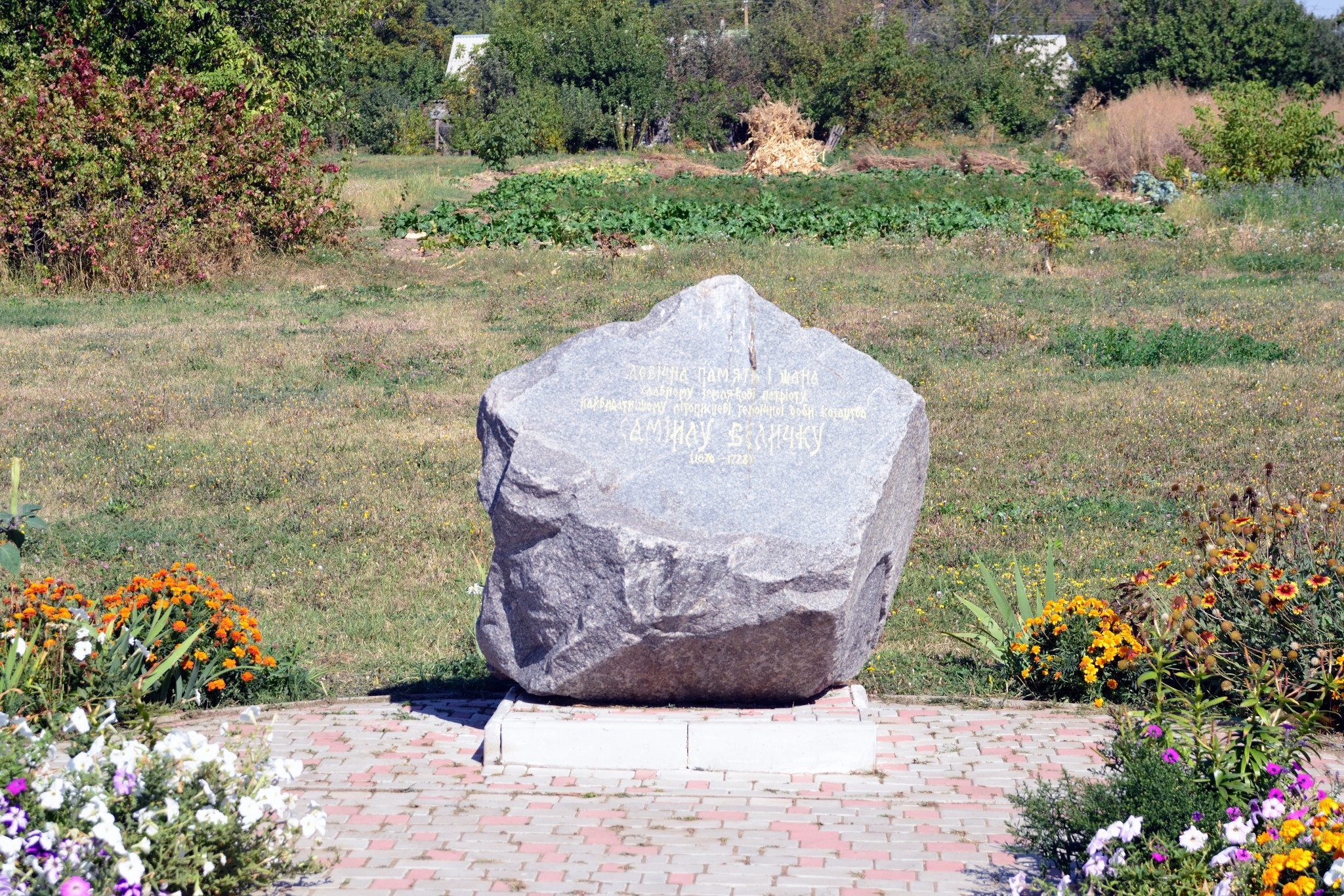
- Memorial sign in honor of Samiilo Velychko, village Zhukyː ″Lifelong memory and honor to famous countryman, patriot, the greatest chronicler of the heroic days of the Cossacks Samiylo Velychko″
- Born: 11 February 1670 vicinity of Poltava, Cossack Hetmanate (modern Ukraine)
- Died: after 1728; Zhuky, Poltava Regiment, Cossack Hetmanate, Russian Empire
- Education: Kyiv Mohyla Academy
- Occupation: chronicler
- Writing career
- Years active: 1715-1728
- Notable work: "Chronicle of Samiilo Velychko" (Story of the Cossack War against Poles...)
- Movement: Ukrainian Baroque

Samiilo Vasyliovych Velychko (Old Ukrainian: Самоил(о) Велічко, Ukrainian: Самі́йло Васи́льович Вели́чко; 11 February 1670 – after 1728) was a Cossack nobleman and chronicler who wrote the, Samiilo Velychko Chronicle, the first systematic presentation of the history of the Cossack Hetmanate.

== Life ==
He was born in the family of the Cossack Vasily Velychko in the village of Zhuky of the first hundred of Poltava regiment. His father was able to write, was a man of wisdom and respected and had a large library. Velychko uccessfully passed entrance exams to the Kyiv-Mohyla Collegium, which at that time was one of the most reputable educational institutions in Europe. He knew Latin, German and Polish languages.

After graduating from collegium before 1690, Velychko served as a clerk of Vasyl Kochubey, fulfilling his special orders related to "the most necessary and secret military affairs," engaging in correspondence with the Russian tsar and sending encrypted letters to the princes of Wallachia and Muntenia. Velychko's correspondence was not known to Ivan Mazepa. He served in that quality for 15 years.

In 1704 or 1705 Velychko started working at the General Military Chancellery. In 1708 Velychko was removed from his post and spent 7 years in prison on allegations of harbouring sympathies to the supporters of Ivan Mazepa. After being released, he moved to Dykanka and worked as a teacher, simultaneously devoting himself to literary work.

== Works ==
- Translation of Cosmographia from German
- The Samiilo Velychko Chronicle, titled The Tale of the Cossack War against Poles led by Zynoviy Bohdan Khmelnytsky (Сказаніе о войнЂ козацкой зъ поляками чрезъ ЗЂновія Богдана Хмельніцкого) - composed between 1715 and 1728, Velychko's main work represents the first systematic historical treatise on the history of Cossack Hetmanate; dedicated to the period between 1620 and 1700, the work used contemporary Ukrainian, Polish and German sources and was written in the Ukrainian literary language of the time, including many elements of vernacular speech; the text has a characteristically opulent style and depict Cossacks as defenders of Ukraine, comparing Bohdan Khmelnytsky to Moses; the work was published between 1848 and 1864 by the Kyiv Archaeographic Commission; it was translated into modern Ukrainian by Valeriy Shevchuk.

== Views ==
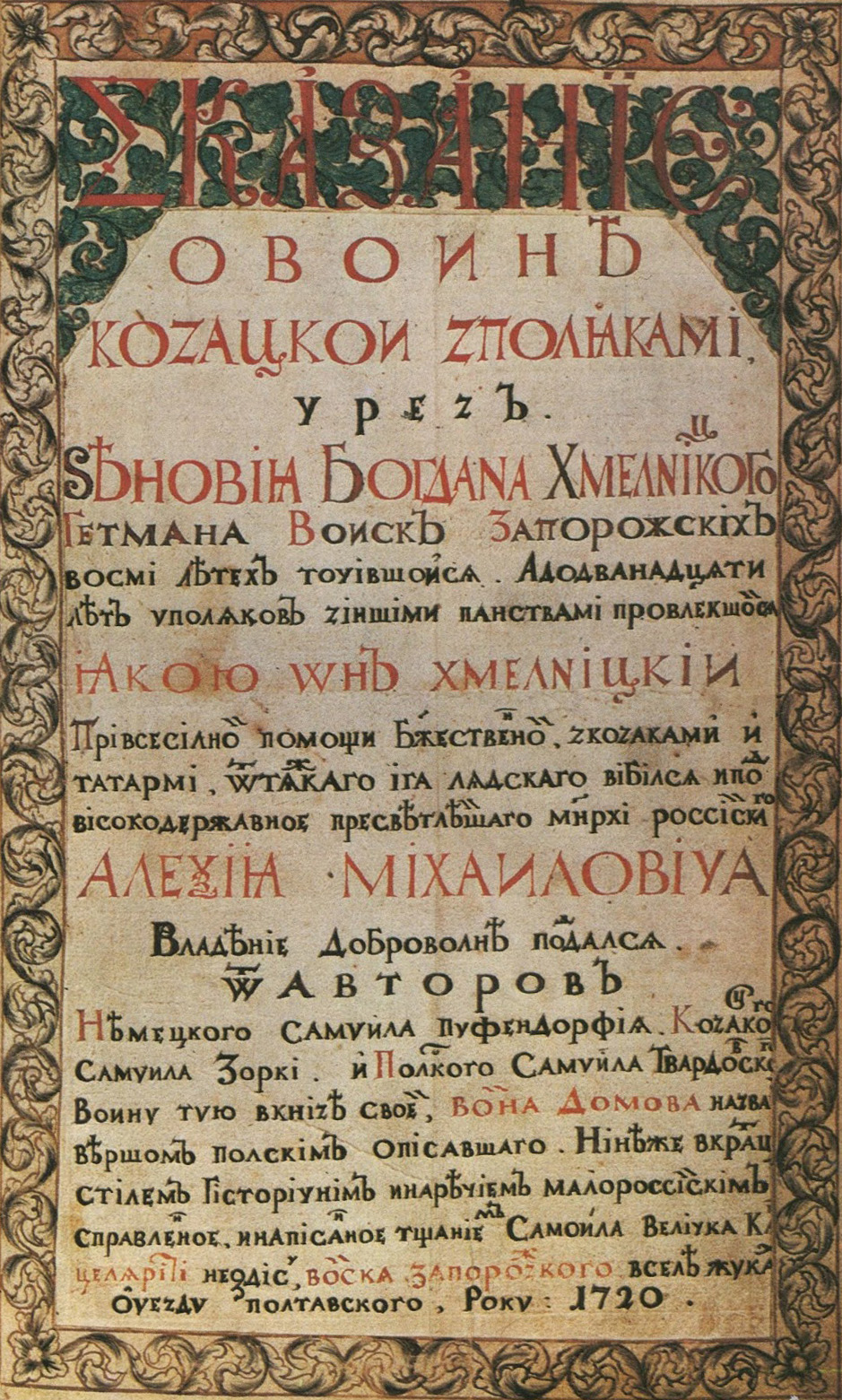
Front page of Samiilo Velychko's chronicle

In his chronicle Velychko emphasized the noble essence of the Cossacks, equalizing them with szlachta of the Polish-Lithuanian Commonwealth. According to him, the ancestors of Cossacks were Sarmatians and Khazars, which made them a separate military class inside of the Ruthenian people, distinct from peasant commoners. In Velychko's vision, the living space of the Ruthenian-Cossack community encompassed the lands of Kyiv, Halych, Lviv, Kholm, Belz, Podolia, Volhynia, Peremyshl, Mstislav, Vitebsk and Polotsk, covering the territory between Wallachia in the south, Vistula in the west, Vilno in the north and Smolensk in the east.

Velychko legitimized the Cossack rebellion against Polish rule by the right to resist (jus resistendi), blaming the magnates of violating the rights of Cossacks contrary to the will of their monarch. According to him, Zaporozhian Sich was the main guarantor of Cossack rights and freedoms and an example of a just society. At the same time, Velychko expressed a degree of nostalgia for the earlier period of Polish rule, depicting it as an era of brotherly relations between Poles and Ruthenians and emphasizing the mutual damage brought to both sides by the conflict between them.

Despite the generally pro-Russian tone of Velychko's chronicle, some of its passages condemn the collaboration of several Cossack leaders with Moscow and criticize the policies of Peter I in respect to Ukraine. Velychko describes the relations between Cossacks and Crimean Tatars as ambivalent, characterized by both animosity and cooperation between the two groups. He depicts the Tatars as brave and just warriors with their own knightly ethics.

== Commemoration ==
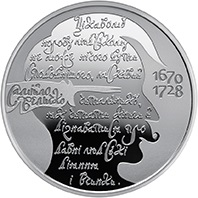
Coin of "Samiilo Velychko" (reverse)

Unfortunately, the grave of Samiilo Velychko has not survived to this day. And in the center of the village Zhuky, on the top, near the chapel of the Protection of the Most Holy Theotokos and the mound of memory, a granite boulder was set up, which symbolizes the last shelter of the famous historian of the Cossack.

Today, in the village where Samiilo Velychko was born, lived and worked, the memorial complex of the glory of the Ukrainian Cossacks was erected. In 2010, the first complex of memory of the dead Cossacks was opened.

In 2003, in order to honor the memory of the glorious Cossack chronicler, the son of Poltava region, and the presentation of the best examples of national culture in the context of the creativity of one of its founders, the regional literary award named after Samiil Wielicz was initiated.

In 2020, the National Bank of Ukraine issued a commemorative silver coin with a face value of ₴10, dedicated to Samiilo Velychko.

== Literature ==
- Velychko, Samiilo.— Internet Encyclopedia of Ukraine, Canadian Institute of Ukrainian Studies
- Encyclopedia of History of Ukraine: 10 volumes. Ukrainian: П. М. Сас. Величко Самійло Васильович та його літопис // Енциклопедія історії України : у 10 т. / редкол.: В. А. Смолій (голова) та ін.; Інститут історії України НАН України. — К. : Наук. думка, 2003. — Т. 1 : А — В. — С. 472. — ISBN 966-00-0734-5
- Velychko S. V. Chronicle. Vol. 1, Vol. 2 Ukrainian: Величко С. В. Літопис. Т. 1. / Пер. з книжної української мови, вст. стаття, комент. В. О. Шевчука; Відп. ред. О. В. Мишанич.— К.: Дніпро, 1991.; Літопис. Т. 2. / Пер. з книжної української мови, комент. В. О. Шевчука; Відп. ред. О. В. Мишанич.— К.: Дніпро, 1991. ISBN 5-308-00314-9 (т. І) ISBN 5-308-00315-7 (т. 2) ISBN 5-308-00316-5
- The village of Zhuky is the birthplace of the chronicler Samiilo Velychko: a collection of materials for the scientific conference. Ukrainian: Село Жуки – батьківщина літописця Самійла Величка: збірник матеріалів наукової конференції / Ред. кол.: Л. В. Бабенко, М. М. Кононенко (голова), А. Г. Логвиненко та ін.; О. Б. Супруненко (відп. ред.) / ЦП НАН України і УТОПІК; УК ПОДА; ПКМ імені Василя Кричевського; Полтавська районна рада.— К.; Полтава: ЦП НАНУ і УТОПІК, 2017.— 80 с., іл. ISBN 978-966-8999-80-2
- Chronicle of events in south-western Russia in the XVIIth century: [in 4 volumes.] / Compiled by Samoil Velichko, former clerk of the office of the Zaporozhsky troops, 1720. Published by the Temporary Commission for the analysis of ancient acts. - Kiev: In the litho-typographical institution of Joseph Wallner; 1848-1864. ;
- Samiilo Velychko commemorative silver coin

Т. 1.— 1848.— [4], VIII, 454, 51, [1], XXX, [2] с.
Т. 2. – 1851.— 36, IV, 37-612, XVII, III с.
Т. 3. – 1855.— [6], IV, XII, 5-568, [2] с.
Т. 4. – 1864.— [2], XI, 407, [1] с.
