= Poltava =

City and administrative center of Poltava Oblast, Ukraine

Poltava Полтава
- City
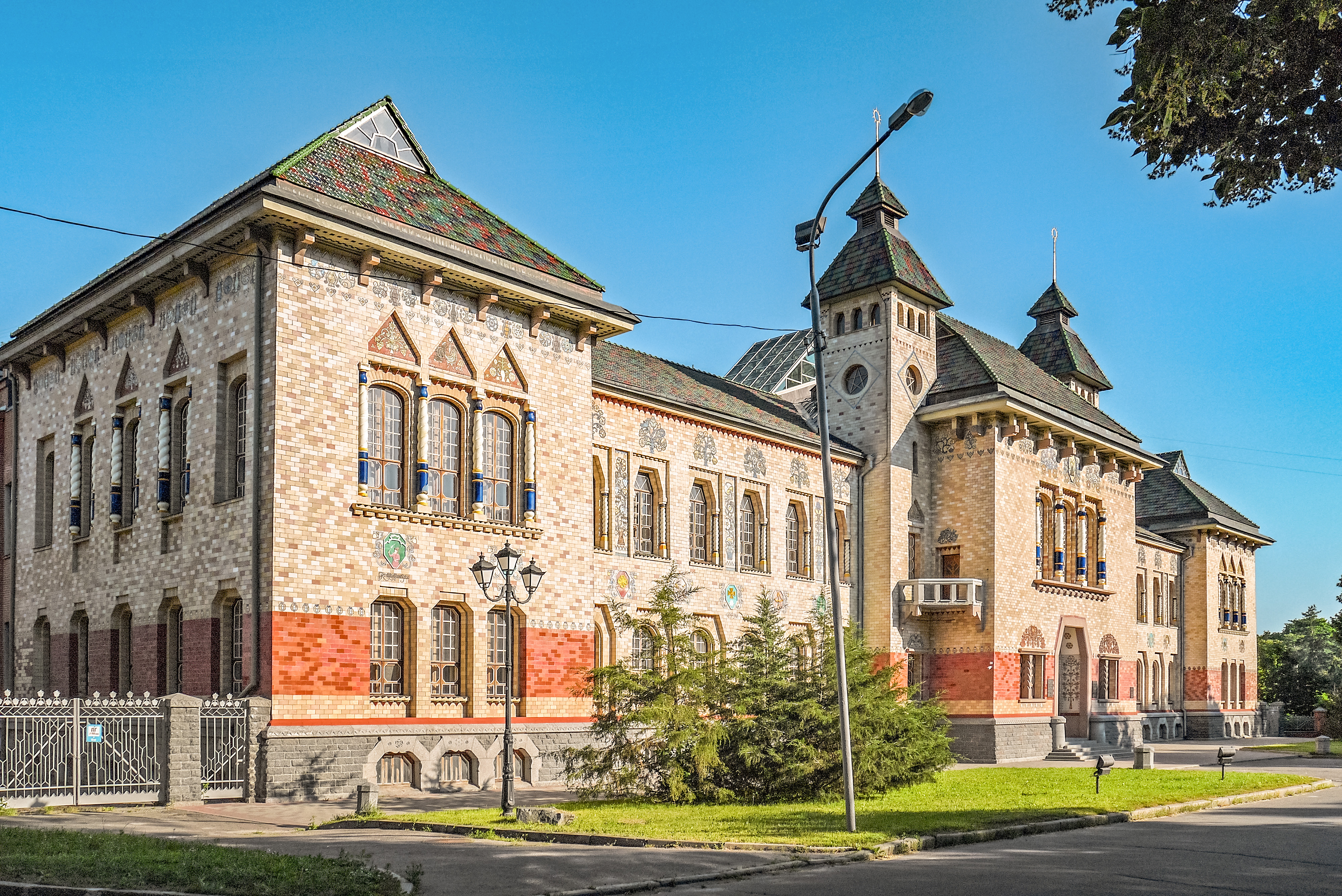
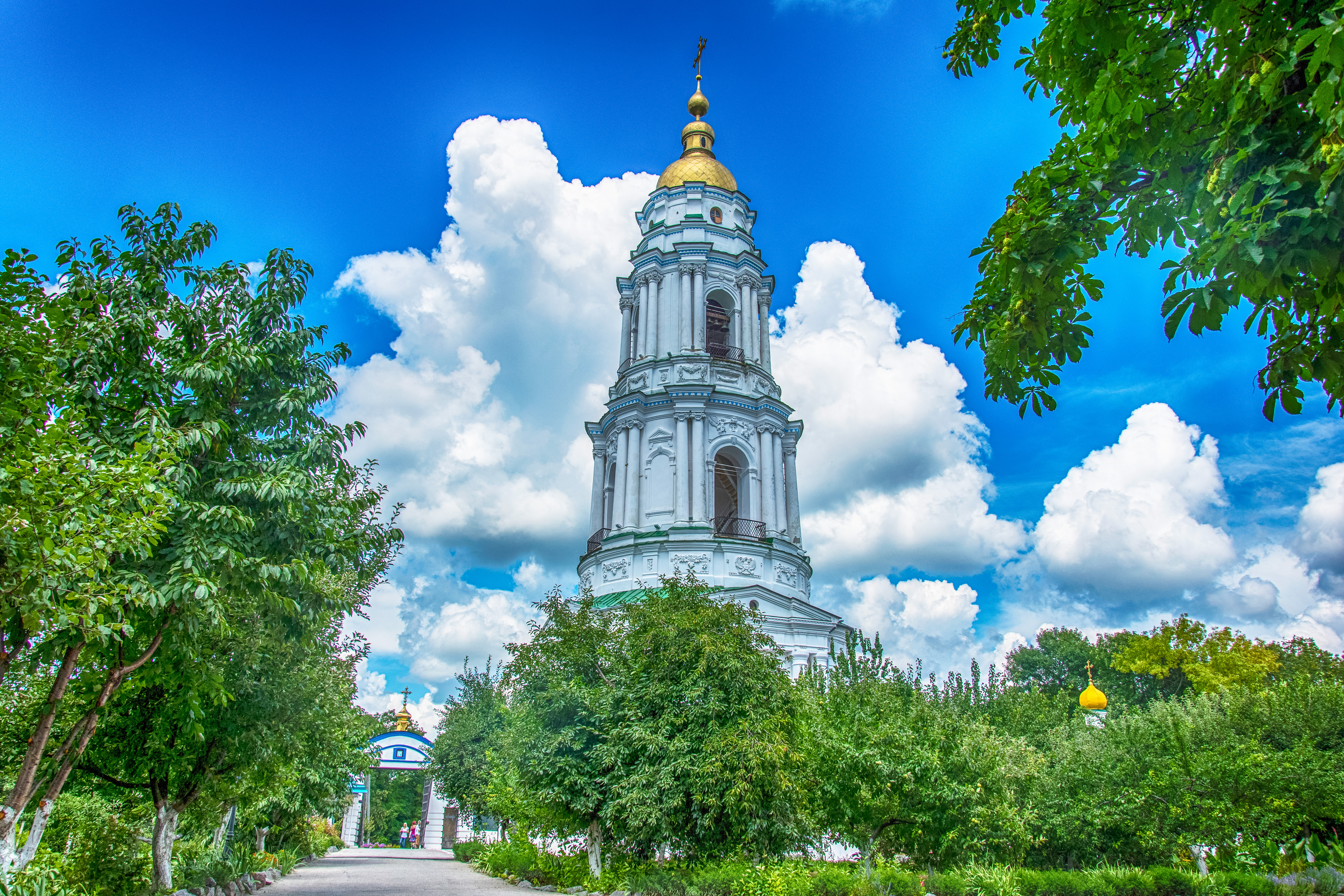
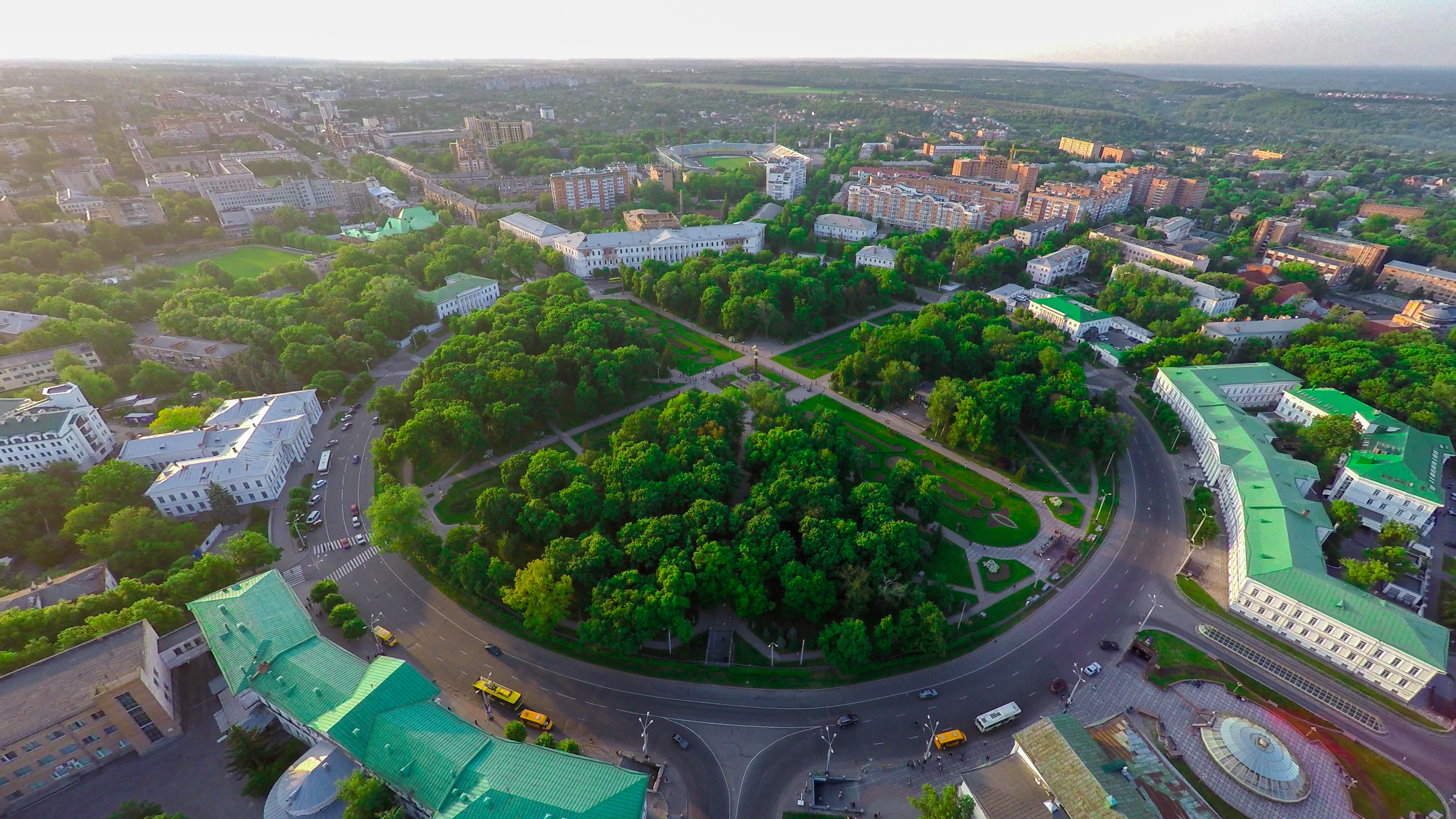
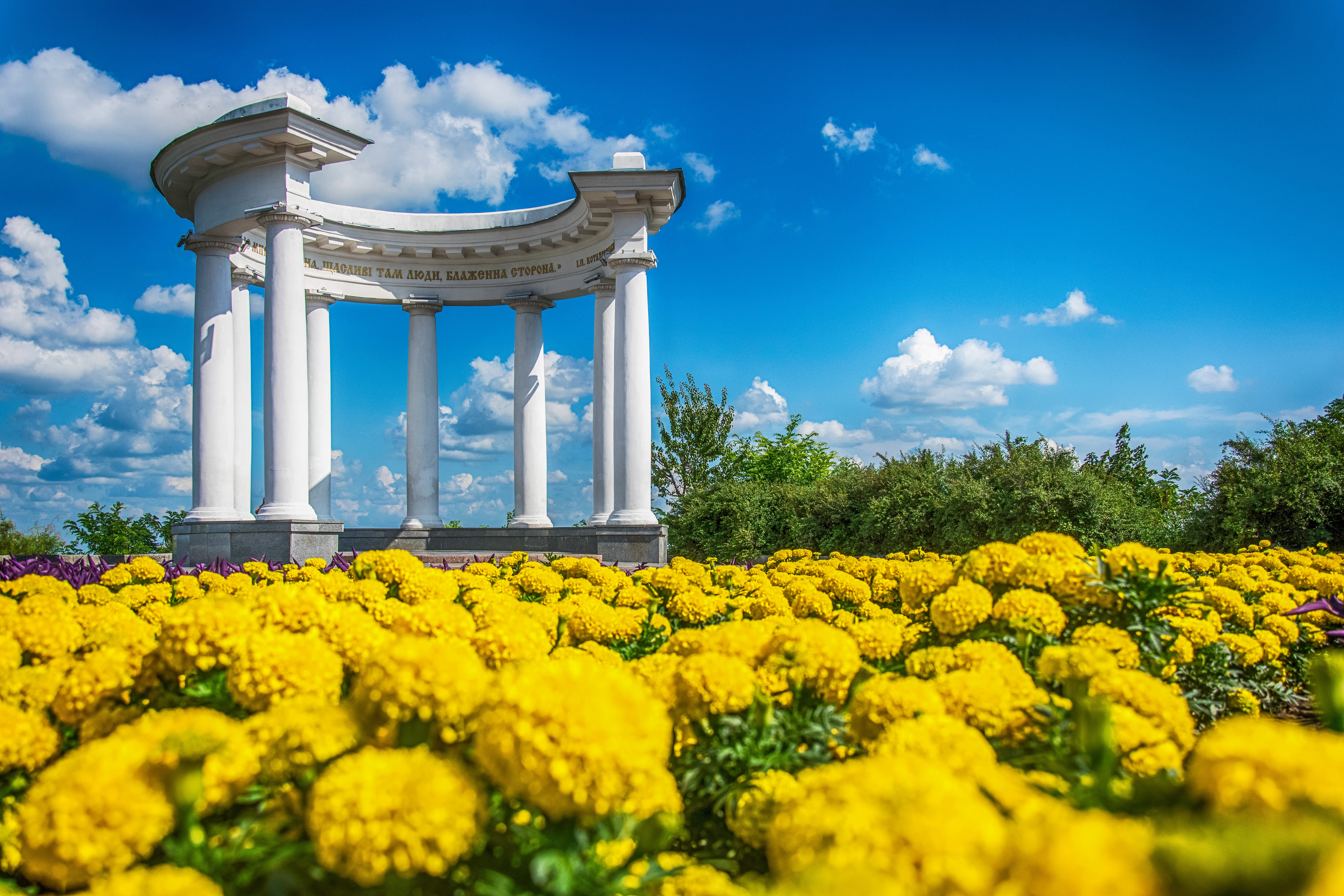
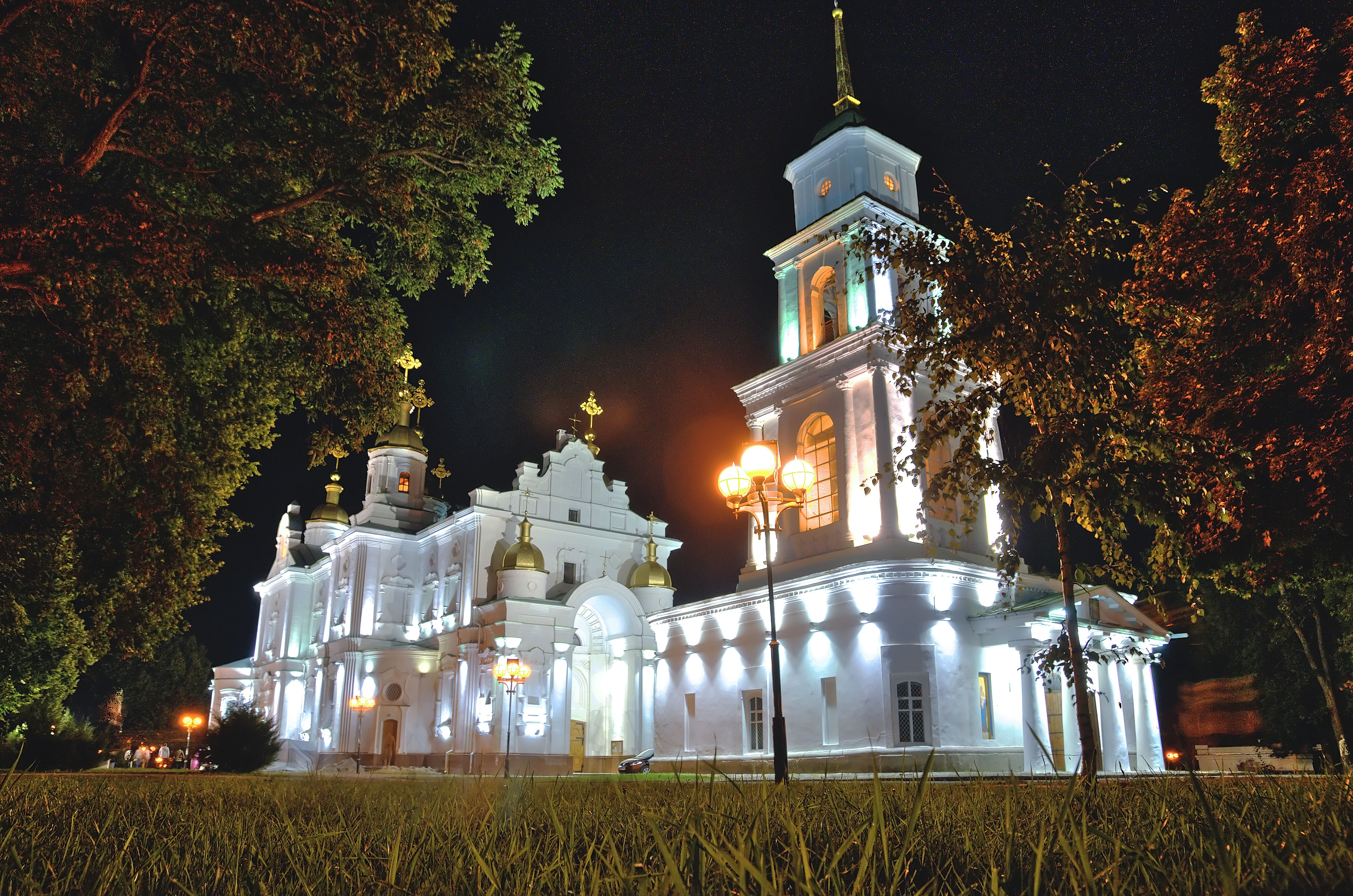
- Poltava Governorate Zemstvo Building Holy Cross Monastery Round Square White Rotunda Dormition Cathedral

- Flag Coat of arms
- Interactive map of Poltava
- Location in Poltava Oblast Location in Ukraine
- Coordinates: 49°35′22″N 34°33′05″E
- Country: Ukraine
- Oblast: Poltava Oblast
- Raion: Poltava Raion
- Hromada: Poltava urban hromada
- Founded: 899 (Note: The previously believed foundation date was 1174.)
- Districts: 3 districts: Shevchenkivskyi District; Kyivskyi District; Podilskyi District

Government
  - Mayor: Kateryna Yamshchykova (Secretary of the City Council)

Area
  - Total: 103 km^{2} (40 sq mi)

Population (2023)
  - Total: 279,593
  - Density: 2,710/km^{2} (7,030/sq mi)
- Time zone: UTC+2 (EET)
  - Summer (DST): UTC+3 (EEST)
- Postal code: 36000—36499
- Area code: +380-532(2)
- Licence plate: CK, BI
- Sister cities: Filderstadt, Ostfildern, Veliko Tarnovo, Lublin, Nice
- Website: rada-poltava.gov.ua/foreign/

Poltava (Note: UK: /pɒlˈtɑːvə/, US: /pəlˈ-/; Ukrainian: Полтава, IPA: [polˈtɑwɐ]) is a city on the Vorskla River in Central Ukraine. It serves as the administrative center of Poltava Oblast as well as Poltava Raion within the oblast. It also hosts the administration of Poltava urban hromada, one of the hromadas of Ukraine. It had an estimated population of 279,593 in 2022.

Poltava was first mentioned as Ltava in Rus' chronicles of the 12th century. Known as Poltava since 1430, in the 17th century the city became part of the Hetmanate, serving as a centre of an eponymous Cossack regiment in Left-bank Ukraine. In 1709 it was the site of a decisive battle of the Great Northern War. Following the dissolution of Cossack Hetmanate, in 1802 Poltava became the centre of an eponymous governorate of the Russian Empire, and housed the residence of the governor general of Little Russia.

Starting from the late 18th century, Poltava became a major cultural centre, with many activists of the Ukrainian national revival living and working in the city. The city was severely damaged during World War II, but was restored and expanded in the following decades. In modern times Poltava remains an important cultural and educational centre, as well as a location of several notable industrial enterprises. Known for its parks, it is reputed to be one of the greenest cities in Ukraine.

== History ==
It is still unknown when Poltava was founded, although the town was not attested before 1174. However, municipal authorities chose to celebrate the city's 1100th anniversary in 1999. As part of the 800th anniversary of Poltava celebrations, in 1974, the Urozhai Stadium was reopened after a six year of renovations. The settlement is indeed an old one, as archeologists unearthed an ancient Paleolithic dwelling, as well as Scythian remains, within the city limits.

=== Middle Ages ===
The present name of the city is traditionally connected to the settlement Ltava, which is mentioned in the Hypatian Chronicle in 1174. According to the chronicle, on Saint Peter's Day (12 July) of 1182, Igor Sviatoslavich, chasing hordes of the Cuman khans Konchak and Kobiak, crossed the Vorskla River near Ltava and moved towards Pereiaslav), where Igor's army was victorious over the Cumans. During the Mongol invasion of Rus' in 1238–39, many cities of the middle Dnipro region were destroyed, possibly including Ltava.

In the mid-14th century the region was part of the Duchy of Kyiv, which was a vassal of the Algirdas' Grand Duchy of Lithuania. According to the Russian historian Aleksandr Shennikov, the region around modern Poltava was a Cuman Duchy belonging to Mansur, who was a son of Mamai. Shennikov also claims that the Mansur Duchy joined the Grand Duchy of Lithuania as an associated state rather than a vassal state, and that the city of Poltava already existed at that time. In 1399, Mansur's army assisted the Grand Ducal Lithuanian Army in the battle of the Vorskla River. According to legend, after the battle, the Cossack Mamay helped Vytautas to escape death.

The city is mentioned for the first time under the name of Poltava no later than 1430. Supposedly, in 1430 the Lithuanian duke Vytautas gave the city, along with Glinsk (today a village near the city of Romny) and Glinitsa, to Murza Olexa (Loxada Mansurxanovich), who moved to the Grand Duchy of Lithuania from the Golden Horde. In 1430 Murza Olexa was baptized as Alexander Glinsky, who was a progenitor of the Glinsky family. According to Shenninkov, Alexander Glinsky must have been baptized in 1390 by Cyprian, Metropolitan of Kyiv, who had just regained his title of Metropolitan of Kyiv and all Russia (rather than the Metropolitan of Russia Minor and Lithuania). On 6 March 1390 Cyprian permanently moved to Muscovy.

In 1482, Poltava was razed by the Crimean Khan Mengli I Giray.

=== Early modern period ===
In 1537 Ografena Vasylivna Glinska (Baibuza) passed Poltava to her son-in-law Mykhailo Ivanovych Hrybunov-Baibuza.

After the Union of Lublin in 1569, Poltava became part of the Kingdom of Poland within the Polish–Lithuanian Commonwealth. In 1630 Poltava was passed to a Polish magnate, Bartholomew Obalkowski. In 1641 it changed ownership again, to Alexander Koniecpolski. In 1646 Poltava became part of Wiśniowiecki Ordynatsia (a large Wiśniowiecki estate in Left-bank Ukraine centered in Lubny), governed by the Ruthenian-Polish magnate Jeremi Wiśniowiecki (1612–1651).

In 1648, the city became the base of a distinguished regiment of Ukrainian Cossacks, and served as a Cossack stronghold during the Khmelnytsky Uprising. In 1650, to commemorate a victory of the Cossack Host over the Polish army at the Poltavka River, the Metropolitan of Kyiv, Sylvester Kossov, ordered the establishment of the Holy Cross Exaltation Monastery in Poltava. The project was financed by a number of prominent local residents, including Martyn Pushkar, Ivan Iskra, Ivan Kramar and many others.

Shields of the Poltava Regiment and Poltava Regiment headquarters

During the 1654 Pereyaslav Council, the Poltava city delegates pledged their allegiance to the Czar of Muscovy, after which stolnik Andrei Spasitelev arrived in Poltava and recorded 1,335 residents who had pledged their allegiance. In 1658 Poltava became a center of anti-government revolt led by Martyn Pushkar, who contested the legitimacy of Ivan Vyhovsky's election to the post of Hetman of Zaporizhian Host. The uprising was extinguished with the help of Crimean Tatars.

On the issue boyar Vasily Borisovich Sheremetev wrote to Alexei Mikhailovich on 8 June 1658: "... the Cherkas [Cossack] city of Poltava is ravaged and burned to the ground and only if the Great Sovereign orders to rebuild on the Tatar Sokma (pathway) of Bakeyev Route and protect many his sovereign cities from Tatar visits. And if the Great Sovereign allows to place a voivode in the city and rebuilt the city until the fall that in Poltava Cherkasy [Cossacks] and residents built their houses and stock-piled their food". With the signing of the 1667 truce of Andrusovo, the city was finally subjected to the Tsardom of Muscovy, while remaining part of the Cossack Hetmanate.

The city suffered from the Great Turkish War when in 1695 Petro Ivanenko led an anti-Muscovite uprising with the help of Crimean Tatars, who ravaged the local monastery. The same year the Poltava Regiment actively participated in the Azov campaigns which resulted in the taking of the Turkish fortress of Kyzy-Kermen (today the city of Beryslav, Kherson Oblast).

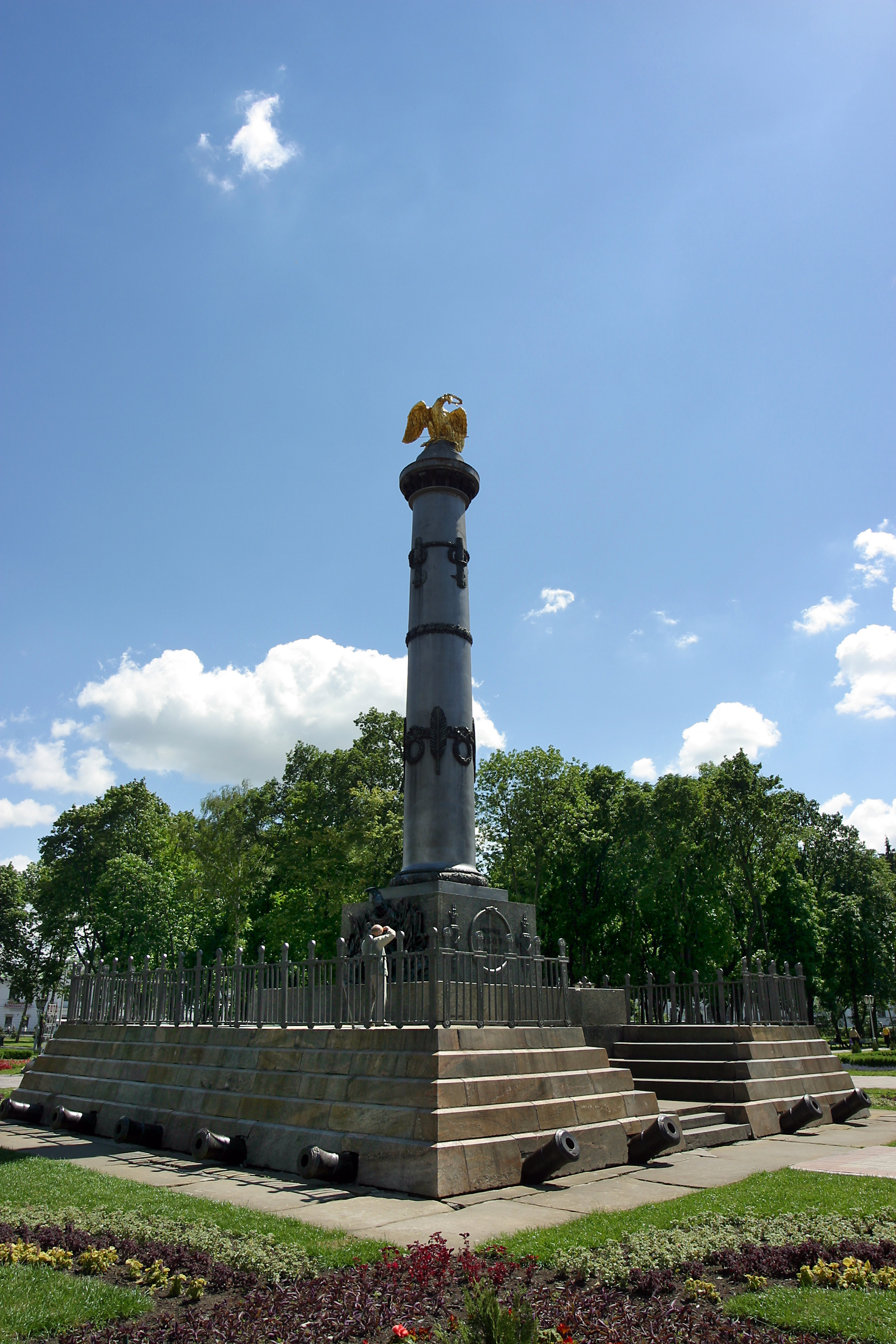
The Column of Glory commemorates the centenary of the Battle of Poltava (1709)

On 8 July (New Style) or 27 June (Old Style) 1709 the Battle of Poltava took place near the city during the Great Northern War. The battle ended in a decisive victory of Peter I of Russia over the Swedish forces. As a result, the Swedish Empire lost its status as a European great power and the Russian Empire began an era of supremacy in eastern Europe. In 1710 there was a plague in the city and its surrounding area. In the mid-18th century the Kolomak Woods near Poltava became a base of haidamaks (Cossack paramilitary bands).

By 1770, Poltava had several brick factories, a regimental doctor, and a pharmacy; that same year the city conducted four fairs. In 1775 it became a city of Novorossiysk Governorate, guarded by the 8th Company of the Dnieper Pike Regiment headquartered in Kobeliaky. In 1775 Poltava's Holy Cross Exaltation Monastery became the seat of bishops of the newly created Eparchy (Diocese) of Slaviansk and Kherson. This large new diocese included the lands of the Novorossiya Governorate and the Azov Governorate north of the Black Sea.

Since much of that area had only recently been seized from the Ottoman Empire by Russia, and a large number of Orthodox Greek settlers had been invited to settle in the region, the imperial government selected a renowned Greek scholar, Eugenios Voulgaris, to preside over the new diocese. After his retirement in 1779, he was replaced by another Greek theologian, Nikephoros Theotokis.

In 1779 the city established the Poltava county school, which became its first secular educational institution. In 1787 Catherine the Great stopped in Poltava on the way from Crimea, escorted by Grigori Potemkin, Alexander Suvorov and Mikhail Kutuzov. In Poltava, on 7 June 1787, before another Russo-Turkish War, Potemkin received his title "Prince of Taurida", while Suvorov received a snuffbox with monogram. In 1802 the city became the seat of the newly established Poltava Governorate. The city's population in 1802 consisted of some 8,000 residents. That same year Poltava opened a government-funded hospital of 20 beds.

=== 19th century ===
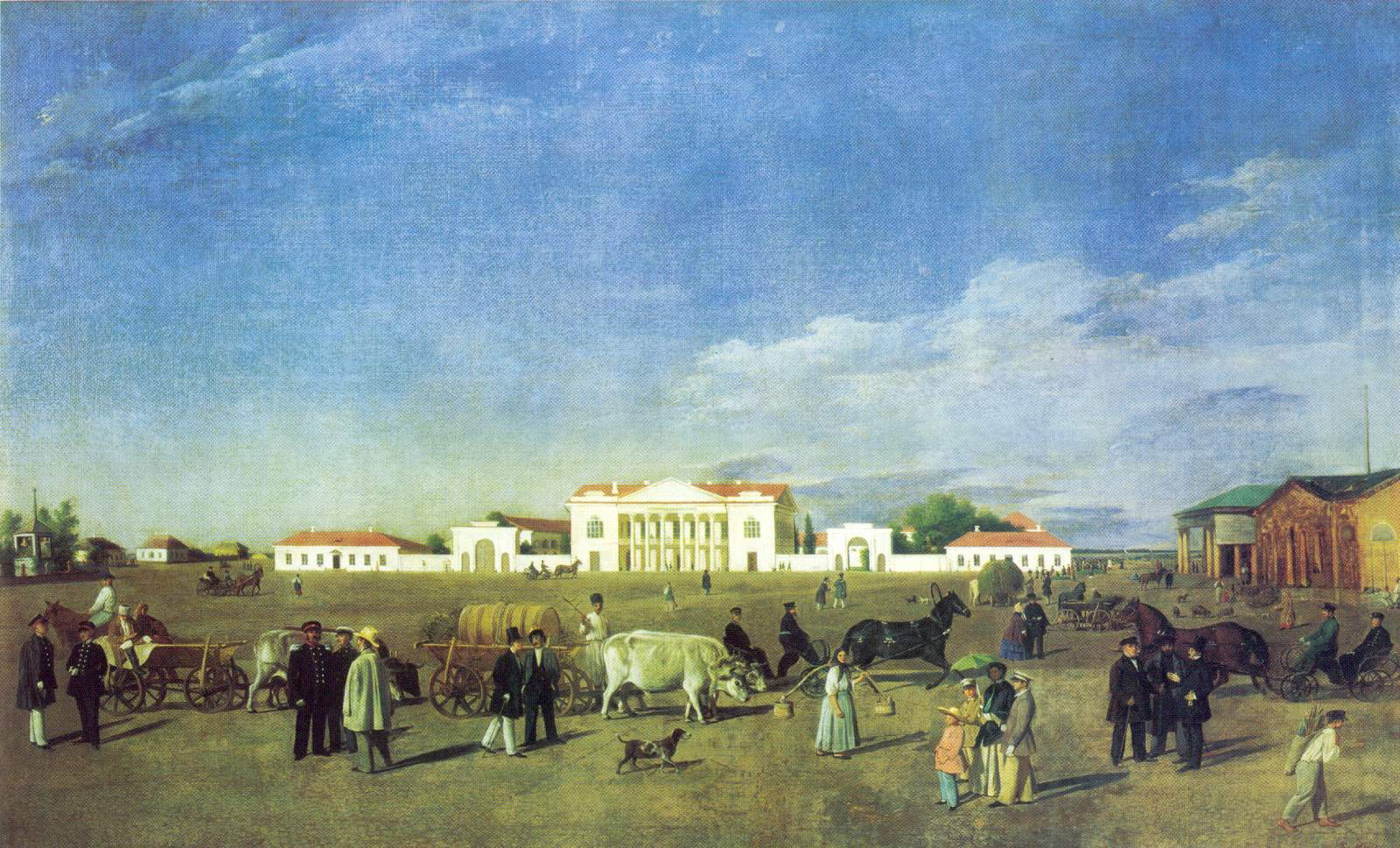
Alexander Square in 1850

On 2 February 1808, the Poltava Male Gymnasium was established. On 20 June 1808 some 54 families of craftsmen were invited to the city from German principalities and settled in the newly established German Sloboda neighborhood with about 50 clay-made houses. In 1810 there were 8,328 people living in Poltava; that same year, the city's first theater was built. In August 1812, on orders of Little Russia Governor General Lobanov-Rostovsky, the famed Ukrainian writer and statesman Ivan Kotlyarevsky formed the 5th Poltava Cavalry Cossack Regiment.

By 1860, Poltava had around 30,000 inhabitants, a district school, a gymnasium, an Institute for Noble Maidens, a spiritual academy, a cadet corps, a library and a number of schools. In 1870, Poltava railway station was opened, leading to rapid economic growth in the region. However, by 1914 the Population of Poltava (around 60,000) was mostly working in small enterprises. In the late 19th and early 20th centuries Poltava became an important cultural centre, where many representatives of Ukrainian national revival were active.

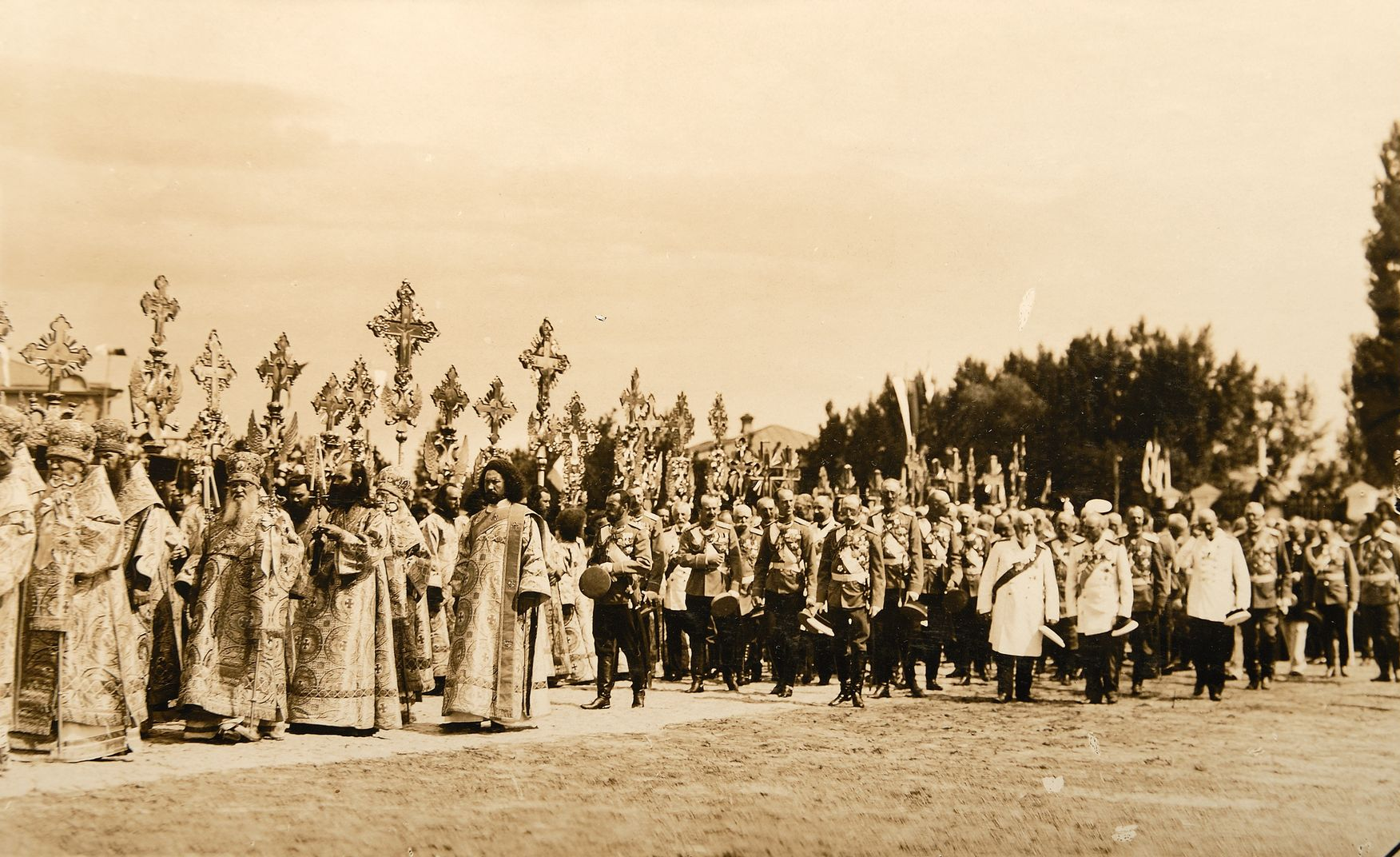
The 200th Anniversary celebrations of the Battle of Poltava in June 1909

=== 20th century ===
==== Ukrainian War of Independence ====
During the events of 1917–1920, Poltava was under the rule of a number of governments, including the Central Rada, Hetmanate, Ukrainian People's Republic, White Movement and Bolsheviks. On 6 March 1918, Poltava became the seat of Poltavshchyna, a newly established zemlia of the Ukrainian People's Republic, which was disbanded on 29 April 1918 by Hetman of Ukraine Pavlo Skoropadsky, who brought back old governorate divisions of the Russian Empire.

==== Soviet rule ====
From 1918 to 1919 Poltava was occupied by the Bolsheviks. After becoming a part of the Ukrainian Soviet Socialist Republic, it was the capital of the Poltava Governorate. The city experienced accelerated industrial growth, and its population increased to 130,000 by 1939.

In World War II, the German Wehrmacht occupied Poltava from 18 September 1941 until 23 September 1943, when it was retaken during the Chernigov-Poltava Strategic Offensive of the Battle of the Dnieper. During the German occupation the Jewish population (9.9% of the total population in 1939) was imprisoned in a ghetto before being murdered during mass executions perpetrated by an Einsatzgruppe and buried in mass graves in the area. The Germans also operated a Nazi prison in the city.

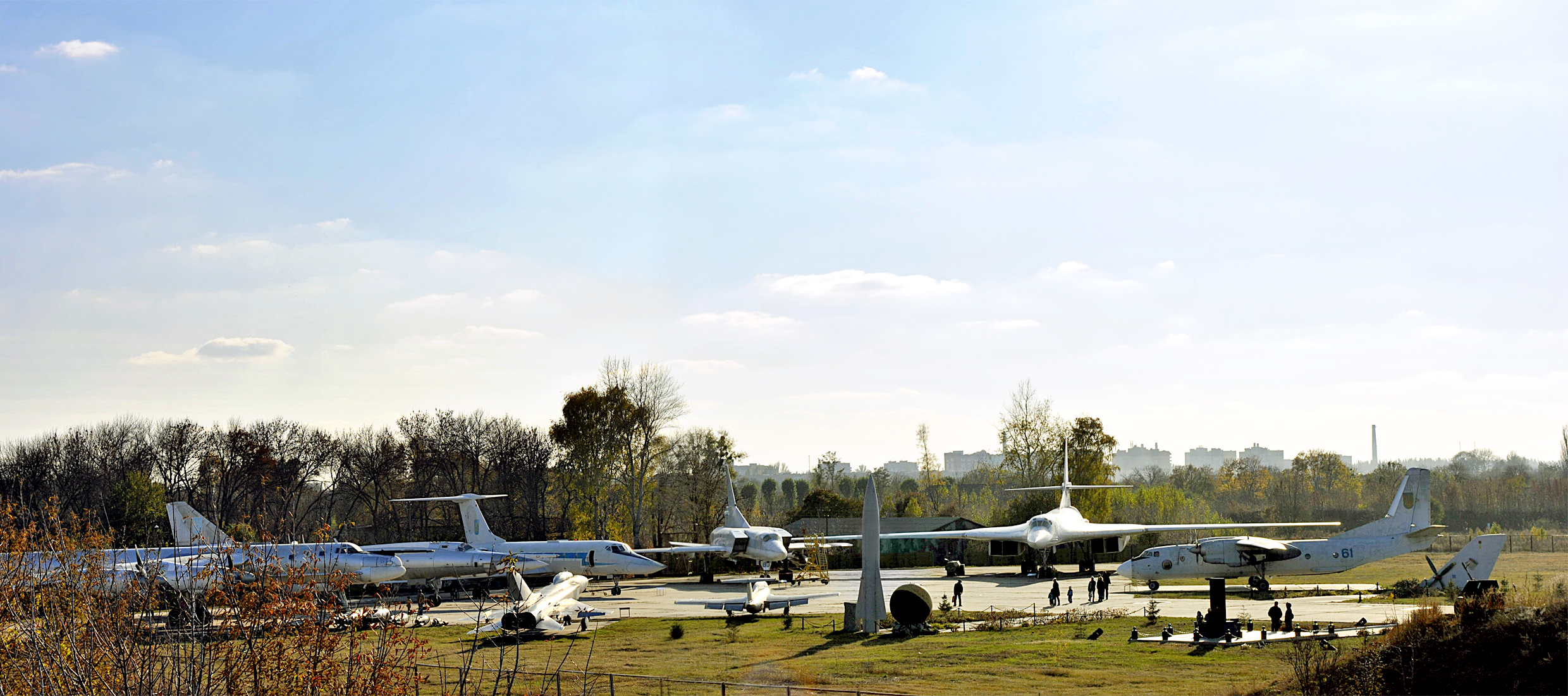
The Poltava Museum of Long-Range and Strategic Aviation

By the summer of 1944, the United States Army Air Forces conducted a number of shuttle bombing raids against Nazi Germany under the name of Operation Frantic. Poltava Air Base, as well as Myrhorod Air Base, were used as eastern locations for landing B-17 Flying Fortress heavy bombers involved in those operations.

The post-war restoration of Poltava continued in the 1950s and 1960s. The city became an important centre of military education in the Soviet Union, where missile and communications officers were prepared, and was also home to a Soviet Air Force division of heavy bombers.

=== Independent Ukraine ===
Until 18 July 2020, Poltava was designated as a city of oblast significance and did not belong to Poltava Raion even though it was the center of the raion. As part of the administrative reform of Ukraine, which reduced the number of raions of Poltava Oblast to four, the city was merged into Poltava Raion.

== Demographics ==
Historical population
Year	Pop.	±%
1775	7,523	—
1881	41,035	+445.5%
1897	53,703	+30.9%
1926	89,391	+66.5%
1939	130,487	+46.0%
1959	143,097	+9.7%
1970	219,873	+53.7%
1979	278,931	+26.9%
1989	314,740	+12.8%
2001	317,998	+1.0%
2011	298,871	−6.0%
2022	279,593	−6.5%
Source: "Cities & Towns of Ukraine".; Voloshyn 2023, p. 367–368

=== Ethnic groups ===
Distribution of the population by ethnicity according to the 2001 census:

Ethnic groups in Poltava
	percent
Ukrainians	87.73%
Russians	10.61%
Belarusians	0.41%
Jews	0.24%
Armenians	0.21%
Azerbaijanis	0.13%
Tatars	0.06%
Moldovans	0.06%
Poles	0.06%
others	0.49%

=== Language ===
Distribution of the population by native language according to the 2001 census:

Language	Number	Percentage
Ukrainian	265,355	85.39%
Russian	43,706	14.06%
Other or undecided	1,694	0.55%
Total	310,755	100.00%

According to a survey conducted by the International Republican Institute in April–May 2023, 75% of the city's population spoke Ukrainian at home, and 12% spoke Russian.

== Geography ==
Poltava is located on the Dnieper Lowland. Its historical part occupies the higher right bank of Vorskla river.

=== Climate ===
Poltava has a warm-summer humid continental climate (Köppen: Dfb), with four distinct seasons, it is one of the coldest cities in Ukraine. The annual precipitation is fairly evenly distributed, with the highest concentration in summer, and which falls as snow in winter.

Climate data for Poltava (1991–2020, extremes 1948–present)
Month	Jan	Feb	Mar	Apr	May	Jun	Jul	Aug	Sep	Oct	Nov	Dec	Year
Record high °C (°F)	11.1 (52.0)	16.0 (60.8)	23.6 (74.5)	29.9 (85.8)	34.2 (93.6)	35.7 (96.3)	39.0 (102.2)	39.4 (102.9)	35.2 (95.4)	29.6 (85.3)	20.0 (68.0)	13.5 (56.3)	39.4 (102.9)
Mean daily maximum °C (°F)	−1.7 (28.9)	−0.3 (31.5)	5.6 (42.1)	15.1 (59.2)	21.7 (71.1)	25.2 (77.4)	27.5 (81.5)	27.1 (80.8)	20.7 (69.3)	12.9 (55.2)	4.8 (40.6)	−0.2 (31.6)	13.2 (55.8)
Daily mean °C (°F)	−4.2 (24.4)	−3.4 (25.9)	1.7 (35.1)	9.9 (49.8)	16.0 (60.8)	19.7 (67.5)	21.7 (71.1)	21.0 (69.8)	15.2 (59.4)	8.4 (47.1)	1.9 (35.4)	−2.6 (27.3)	8.8 (47.8)
Mean daily minimum °C (°F)	−6.5 (20.3)	−6.0 (21.2)	−1.6 (29.1)	5.2 (41.4)	10.6 (51.1)	14.6 (58.3)	16.4 (61.5)	15.5 (59.9)	10.4 (50.7)	4.8 (40.6)	−0.4 (31.3)	−4.7 (23.5)	4.9 (40.8)
Record low °C (°F)	−32.2 (−26.0)	−29.1 (−20.4)	−22.8 (−9.0)	−11.1 (12.0)	−1.7 (28.9)	3.0 (37.4)	7.2 (45.0)	2.8 (37.0)	−3.0 (26.6)	−11.1 (12.0)	−21.5 (−6.7)	−28.6 (−19.5)	−32.2 (−26.0)
Average precipitation mm (inches)	42 (1.7)	33 (1.3)	42 (1.7)	37 (1.5)	58 (2.3)	70 (2.8)	65 (2.6)	39 (1.5)	52 (2.0)	48 (1.9)	41 (1.6)	45 (1.8)	572 (22.5)
Average precipitation days (≥ 1.0 mm)	8.8	7.4	8.3	6.5	8.5	7.8	7.0	5.1	6.2	6.3	7.1	8.0	87.0
Average relative humidity (%)	87.0	83.4	75.6	61.9	61.5	64.8	64.6	60.4	67.3	76.9	86.0	87.9	73.1
Mean monthly sunshine hours	68	76	132	183	266	293	301	285	215	144	59	42	2,064
Source 1: Pogoda.ru
Source 2: NOAA (humidity and precipitation 1991–2020; sun 1961–1990)

== Government and subdivisions ==
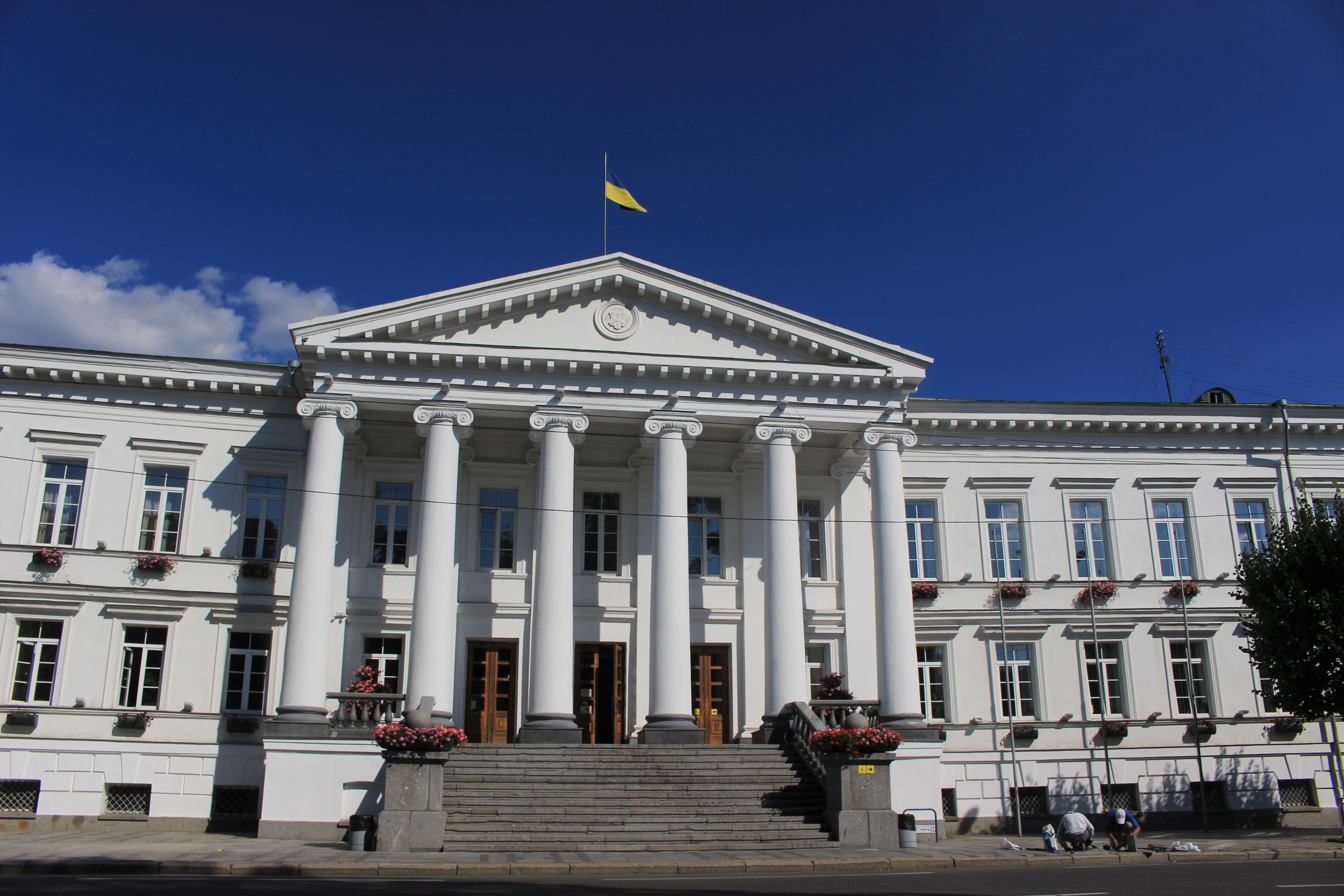
City Hall

Poltava is the administrative center of the Poltava Oblast (province) as well as of the Poltava Raion housed within the city. However, Poltava is a city of oblast subordinance, thus being subject directly to the oblast authorities rather to the raion administration housed in the city itself.

Poltava's government consists of the 50-member Poltava City Council (Ukrainian: Полтавська Міська рада) which is headed by the Secretary (currently Oleksandr Kozub). The city's current mayor is Oleksandr Mamay, who was sworn in on 4 November 2010 after being elected with more than 61 percent of the vote. In 2015 he was re-elected as a candidate of Conscience of Ukraine with 62.9% in a second round of Mayoral election.

The territory of Poltava is divided into 3 urban districts:

1. Shevchenkivskyi District, to the south-west with an area of 2077 hectares and a population of 147,600 in 2005. It is a largely residential area and includes the city centre.
2. Kyivskyi District, is the largest by area, comprising 5437 hectares, or 52.8% of the city total, situated in the north and north-west. Its census in 2005 was 111,900. This district has a large industrial zone.
3. Podilskyi District, to the east and south-east, in the valley of the Vorskla River, with an area of 2988 hectares and a population of 53,700 in 2005.

The village of Rozsoshentsi, Shcherbani, Tereshky, Kopyly and Suprunivka are officially considered to be outside the city, but constitute part of the Poltava agglomeration.

== Culture ==
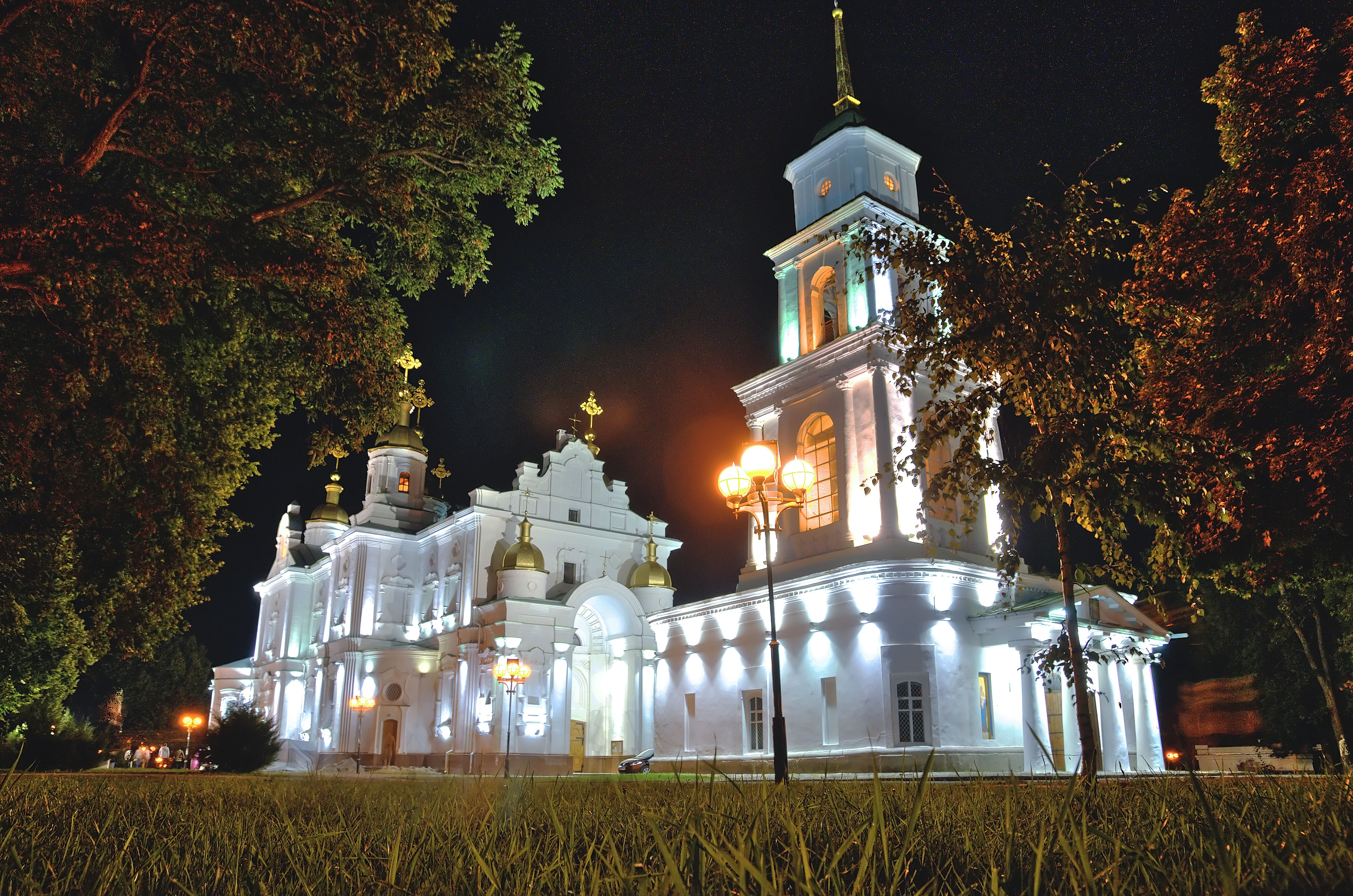
Assumption Cathedral

The centre of the old city is a semicircular Neoclassical square with the Tuscan column of cast iron (1805–11), commemorating the centenary of the Battle of Poltava and featuring 18 Swedish cannons captured in that battle. As Peter the Great celebrated his victory in the Saviour church, this 17th-century wooden shrine was carefully preserved to this day. The five-domed city cathedral, dedicated to the Exaltation of the Cross, is an example of Cossack Baroque, built between 1699 and 1709. Another Baroque church, dedicated to the Dormition of the Theotokos, was destroyed in 1934 and rebuilt in the 1990s.

A minor planet 2983 Poltava discovered in 1981 by Soviet astronomer Nikolai Stepanovich Chernykh is named after the city.

== Economy and infrastructure ==
=== Transportation ===
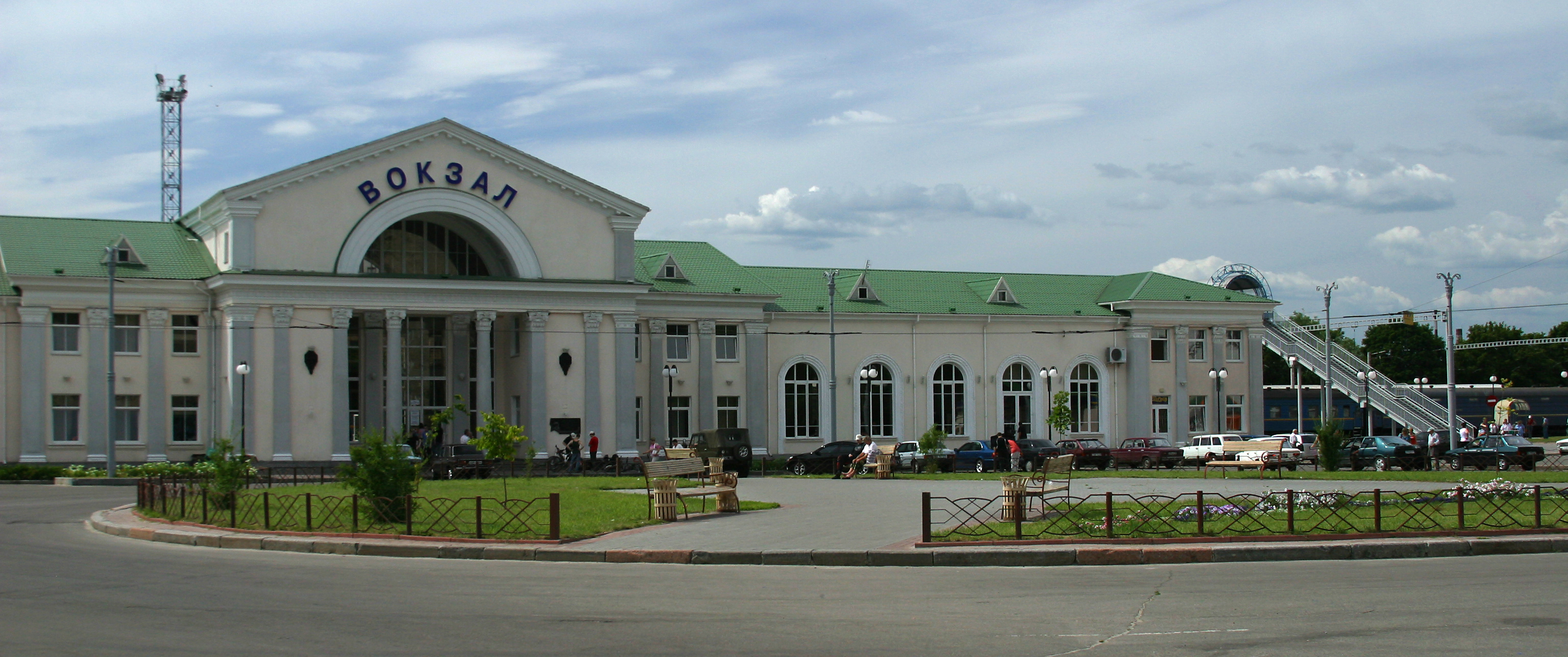
Poltava-Kyivska railway station

Poltava's transportation infrastructure consists of two major train stations: Poltava-Pivdenna and Poltava-Kyivska, with railway links to Kyiv, Kharkiv, and Kremenchuk. Poltava-Kyiv line is electrified and is used by the Poltava Express. The electrification of the Poltava-Kharkiv line was completed in August 2008.

The Avtovokzal serves as the city's intercity bus station. Buses for local municipal routes depart from "AC-2" (autostation No. 2 – along Shevchenko Street) and "AC-3" (Zinkivska Street). Local municipal routes are parked along the Taras Shevchenko Street. Marshrutka minibuses serve areas where regular bus access is unavailable; however, they are privately owned and cost more per ride. In addition, a 10-route trolleybus network of 72.6 kilometres (45.1 mi) runs throughout the city. On the routes of the city go more than 50 units of trolleybuses.

Poltava is also served by an International Airport, situated outside the city limits near the village of Ivashky. The international highway M03, linking Poltava with Kyiv and Kharkiv, passes through the southern outskirts of the city. There is also a regional highway P-17 crossing Poltava and linking it with Kremenchuk and Sumy.

== Education ==
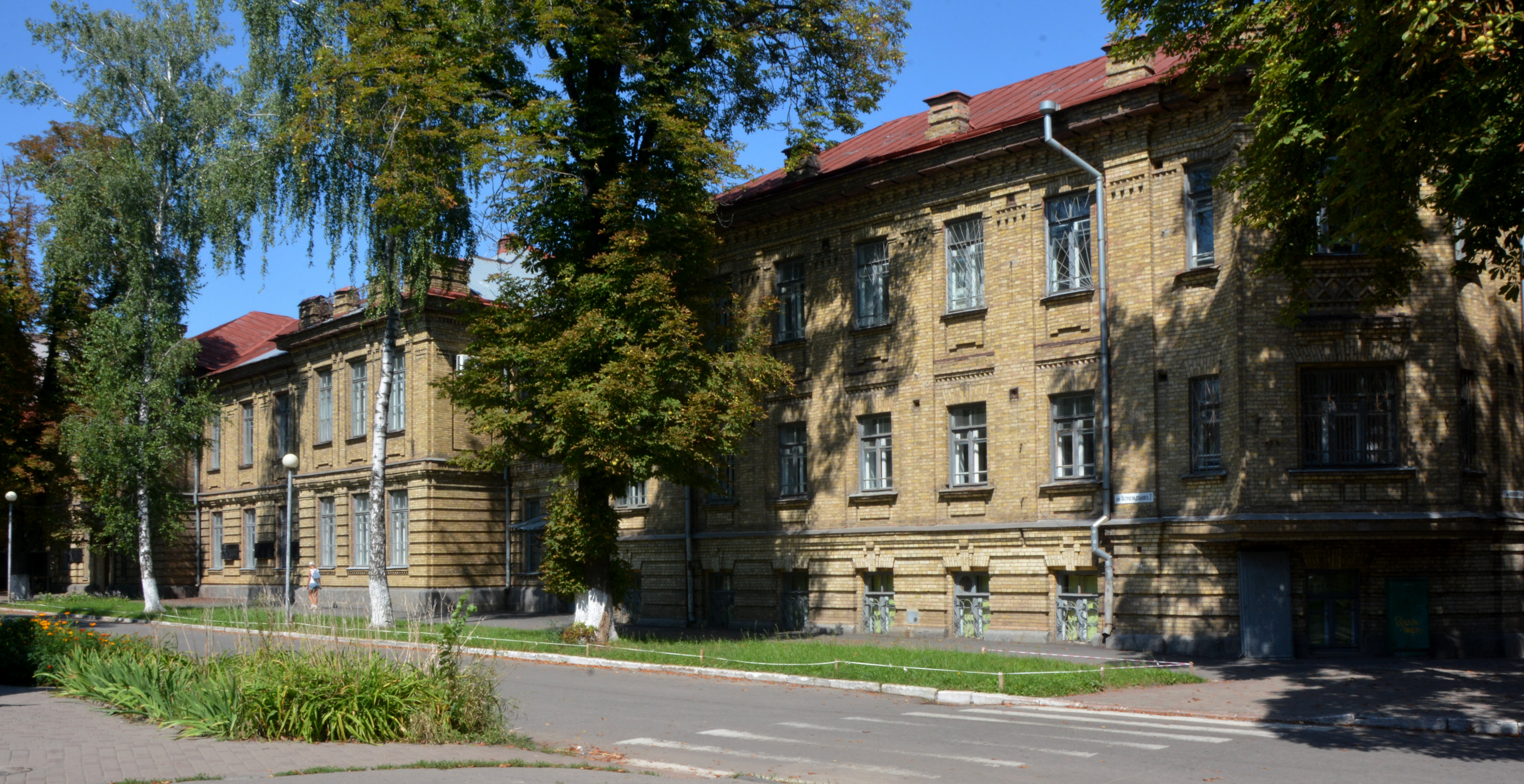
Poltava V.G. Korolenko National Pedagogical University

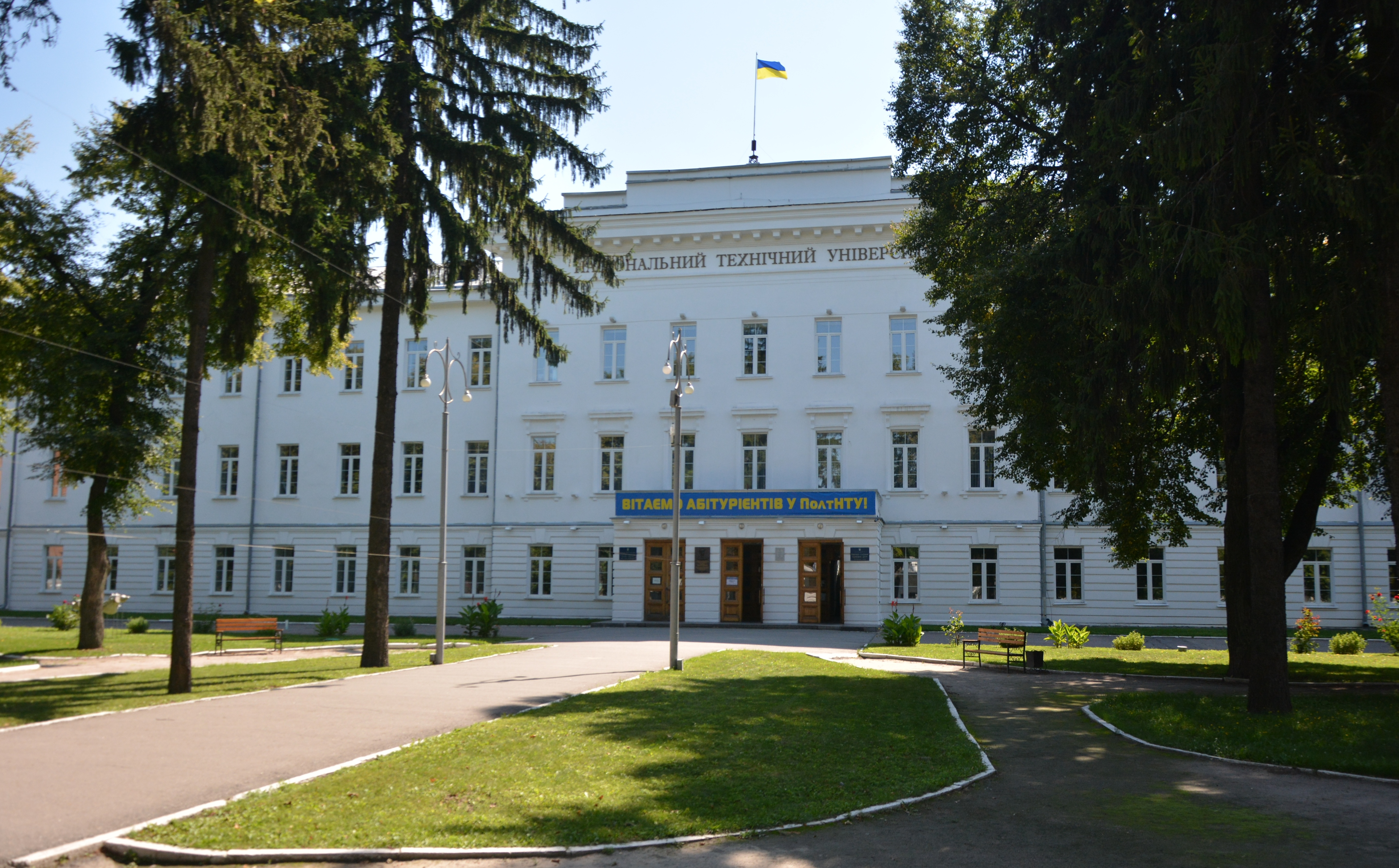
Poltava National Technical University

Poltava has always been one of the most important science and education centres in Ukraine. Major universities and institutions of higher education include the following:

- Poltava National Pedagogical University named after V. G. Korolenko
- Poltava National Technical University
- Poltava Agrarian State Academy
- Poltava State Medical University
- Poltava University of Economics and Trade
- Poltava Military Institute of Connections
- Poltava Law Institute of Yaroslav Mudryi National Law University
- Poltava branch of the State Academy of Statistics, region and audit to the State Statistics Committee of Ukraine

Astronomy

- Poltava gravimetric observatory (PGO) is situated a bit north from city centre (27–29 Miasoyedov St.). Its main work directions are measurements of Earth rotation, latitude variations (applying zenith stars observations, lunar occultation observations and other)
- Observational station of PGO in rural area, some 20 km east along the M03-E40 highway. Radiotelescope URAN-2 (Ukrainian: УРАН-2) is situated there too.

== Sports ==
The most popular sport is football (soccer). Two professional football teams are based in the city: Vorskla Poltava and SC Poltava, there was also FC Poltava dissolved in 2018. There are 3 stadiums in Poltava: Butovsky Vorskla Stadium (main city stadium), Dynamo Stadium are situated in the city centre and Lokomotiv Stadium which is situated in Podil district.

== Twin towns – sister cities ==
Poltava is twinned with:

- Veliko Tarnovo, Bulgaria (1963)
- Filderstadt, Germany
- Ostfildern, Germany
- Irondequoit, United States
- Kristianstad, Sweden
- Kouvola, Finland

== Notable people ==
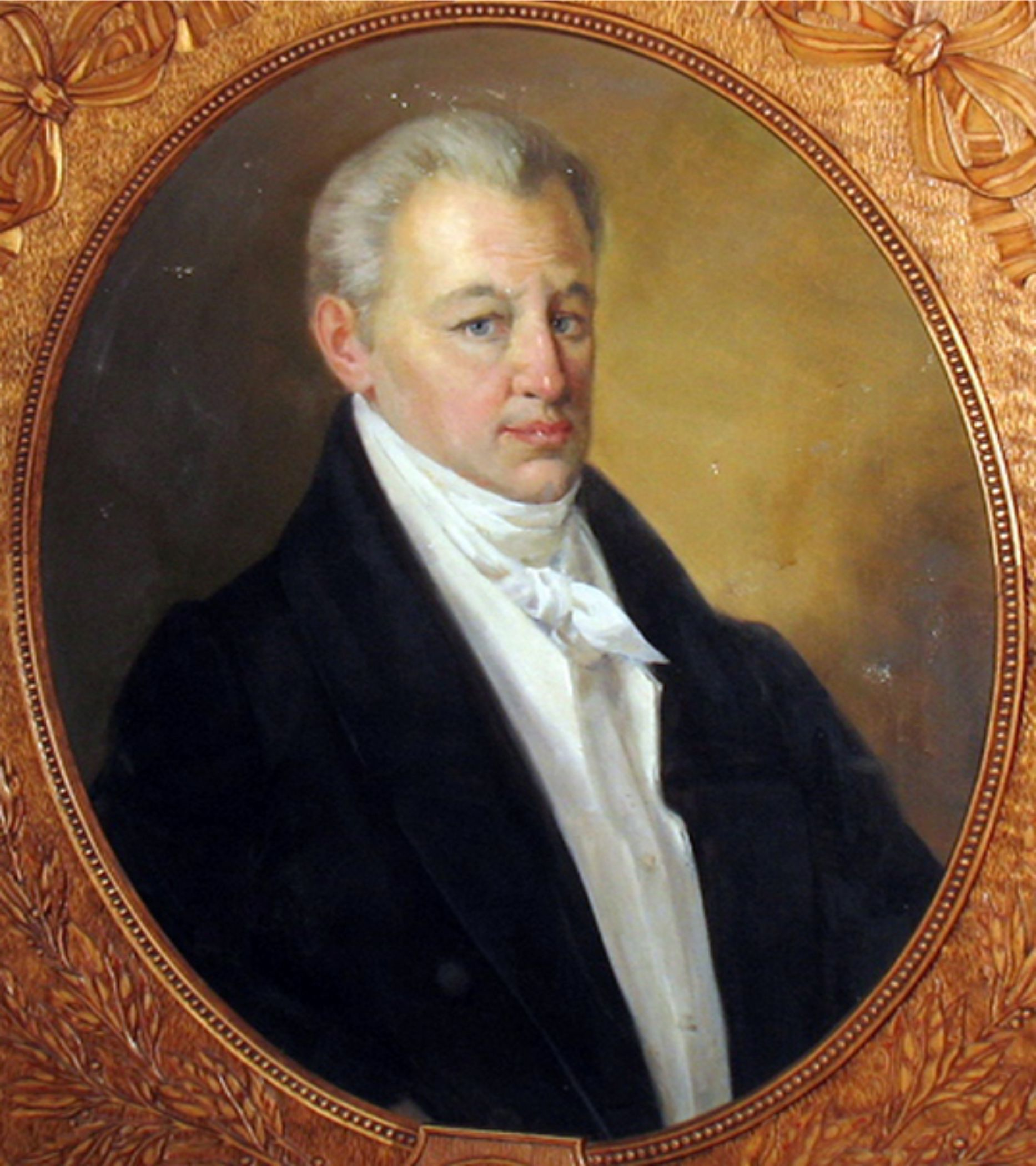
Ivan Kotliarevsky was born in Poltava in 1769.

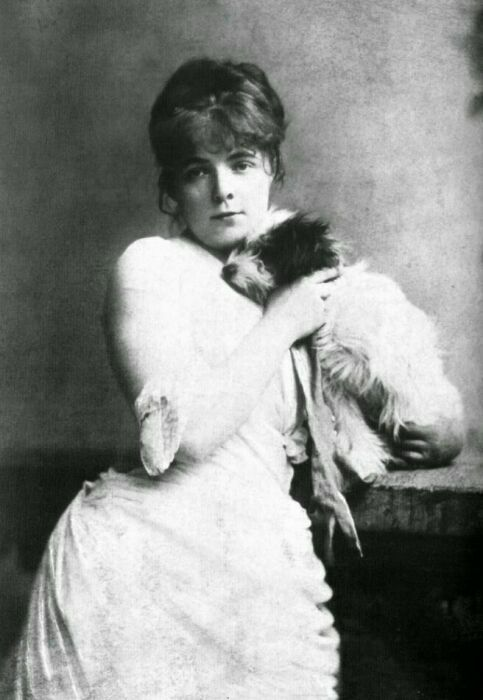
Marie Bashkirtseff, born near Poltava in 1858.

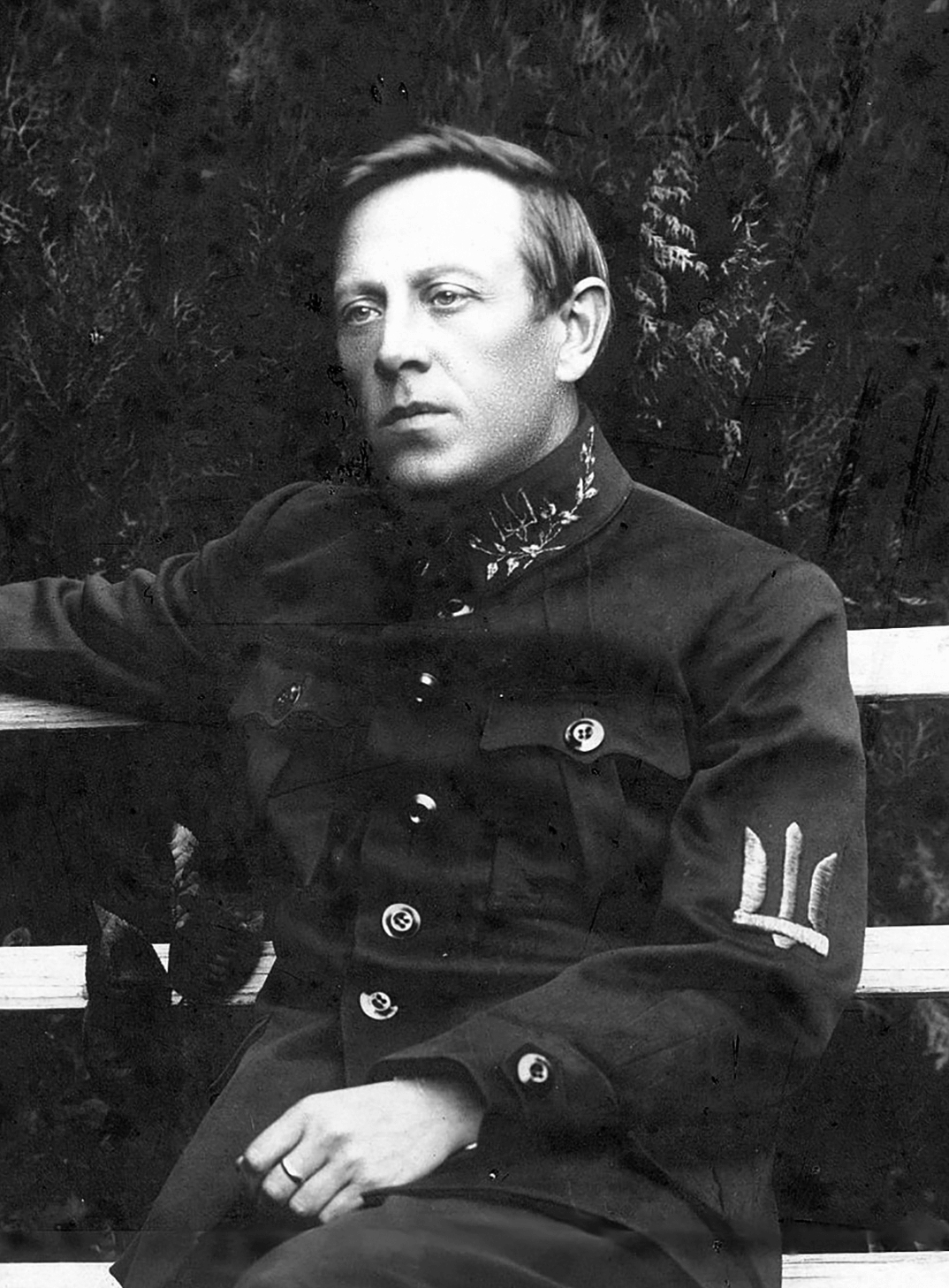
Symon Petliura was born in Poltava in 1879.

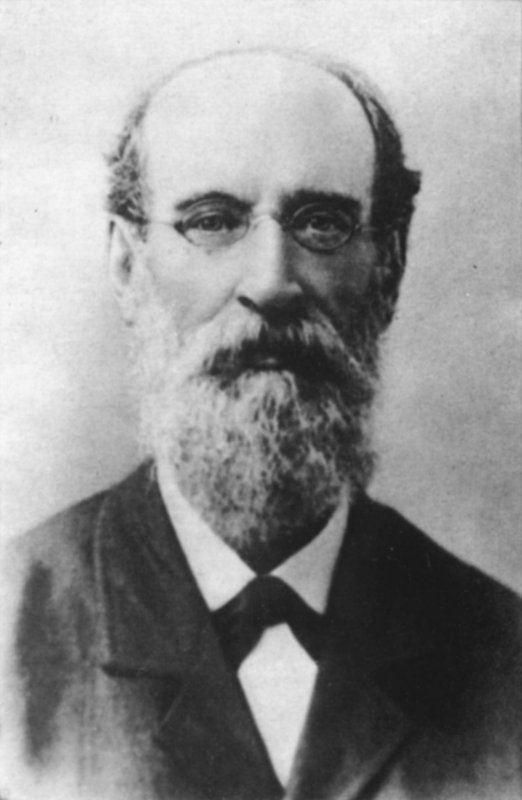
Panas Myrny moved to Poltava in 1871 and lived there until the end of his life.

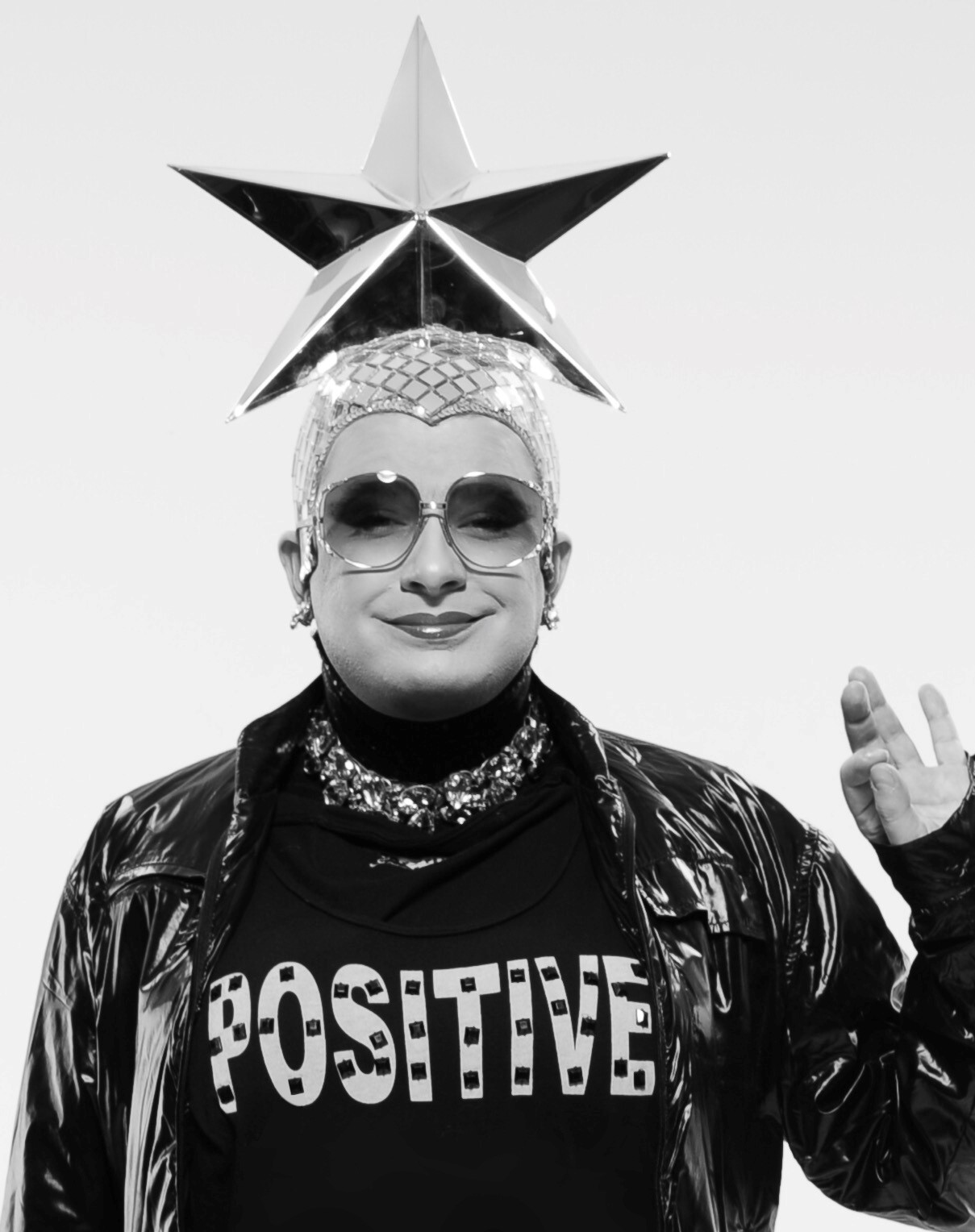
Verka Serduchka (Andrii Danylko), born in Poltava in 1973.

== Gallery ==
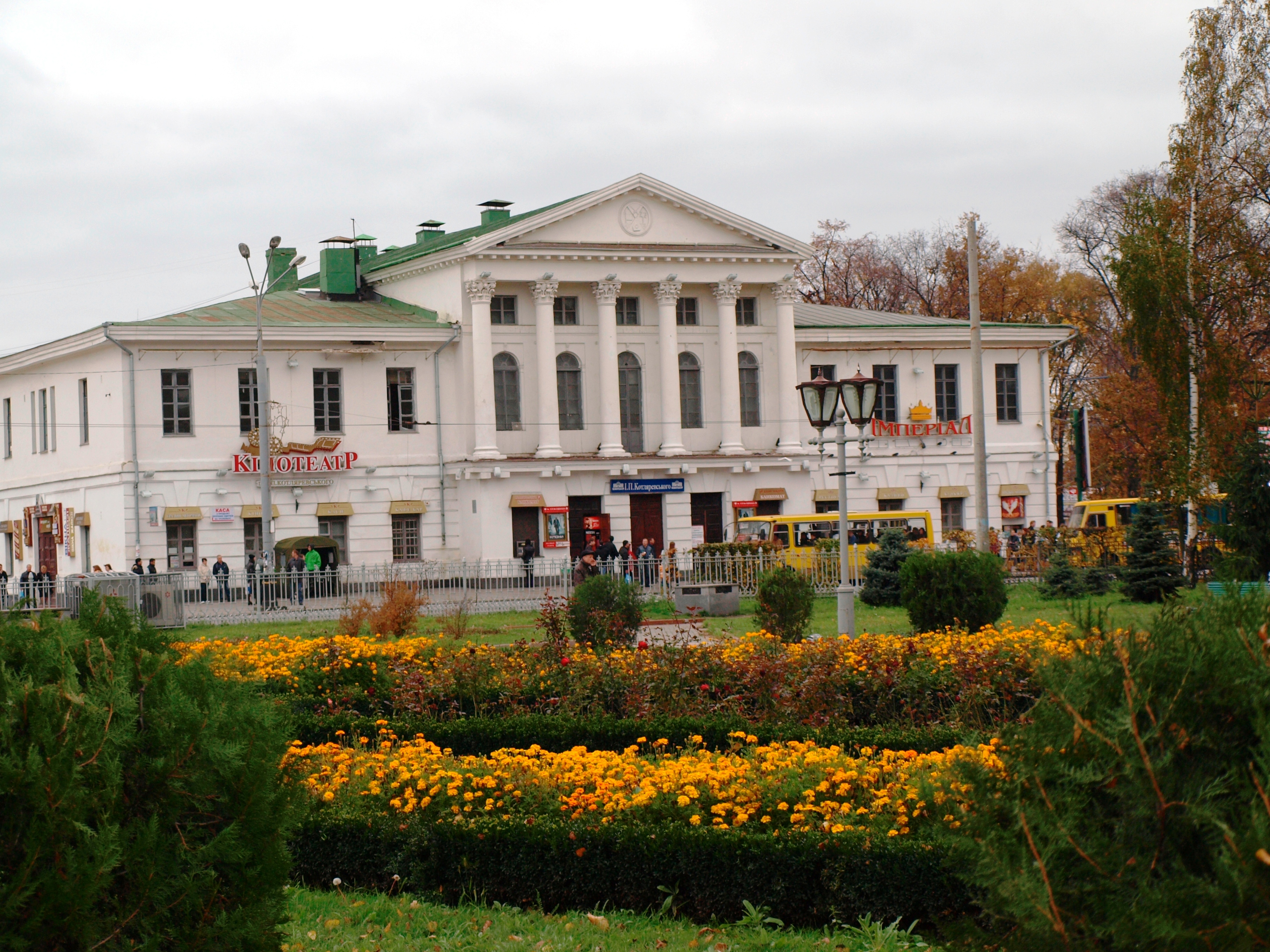
Building of the Noble Assembly

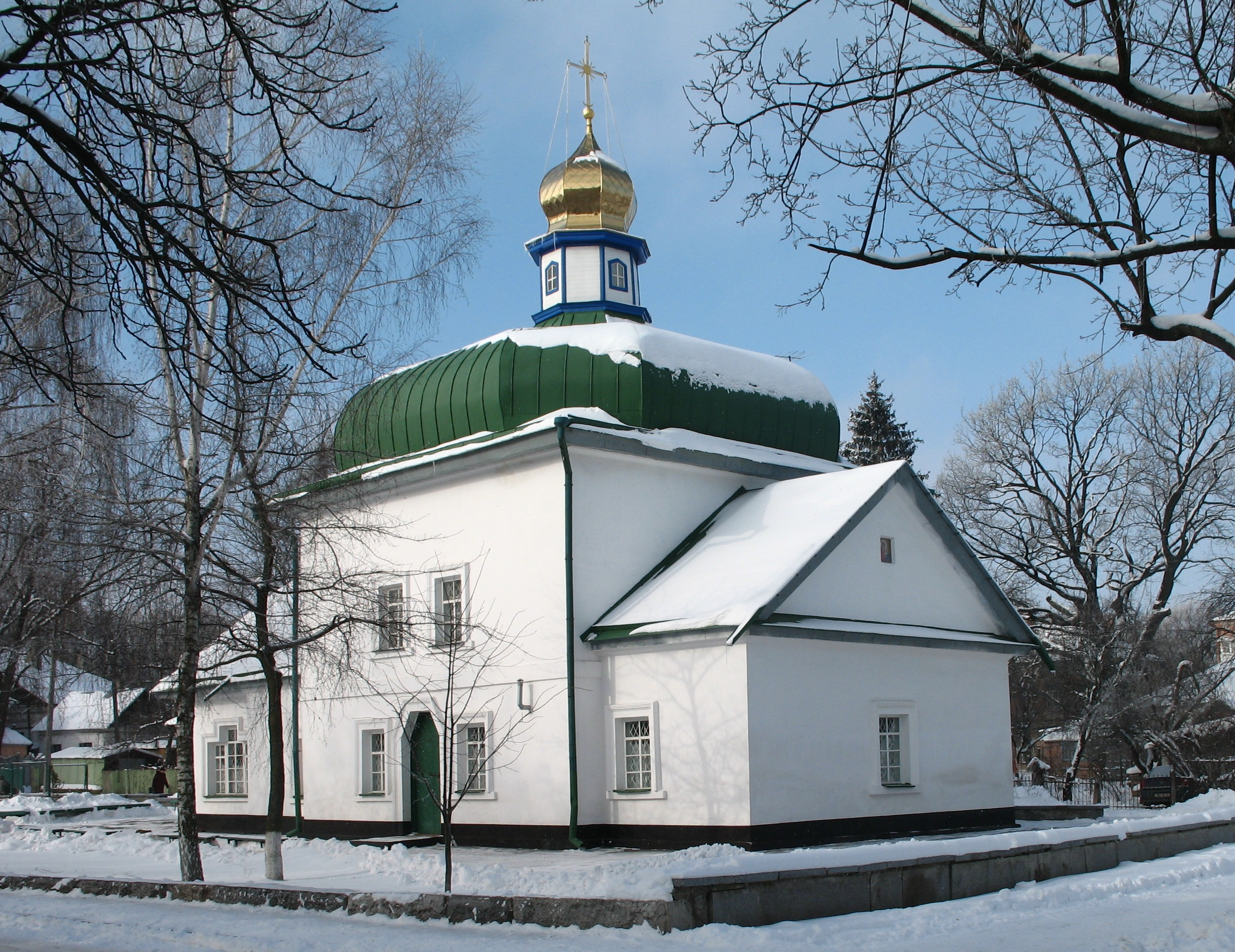
Church of the Savior

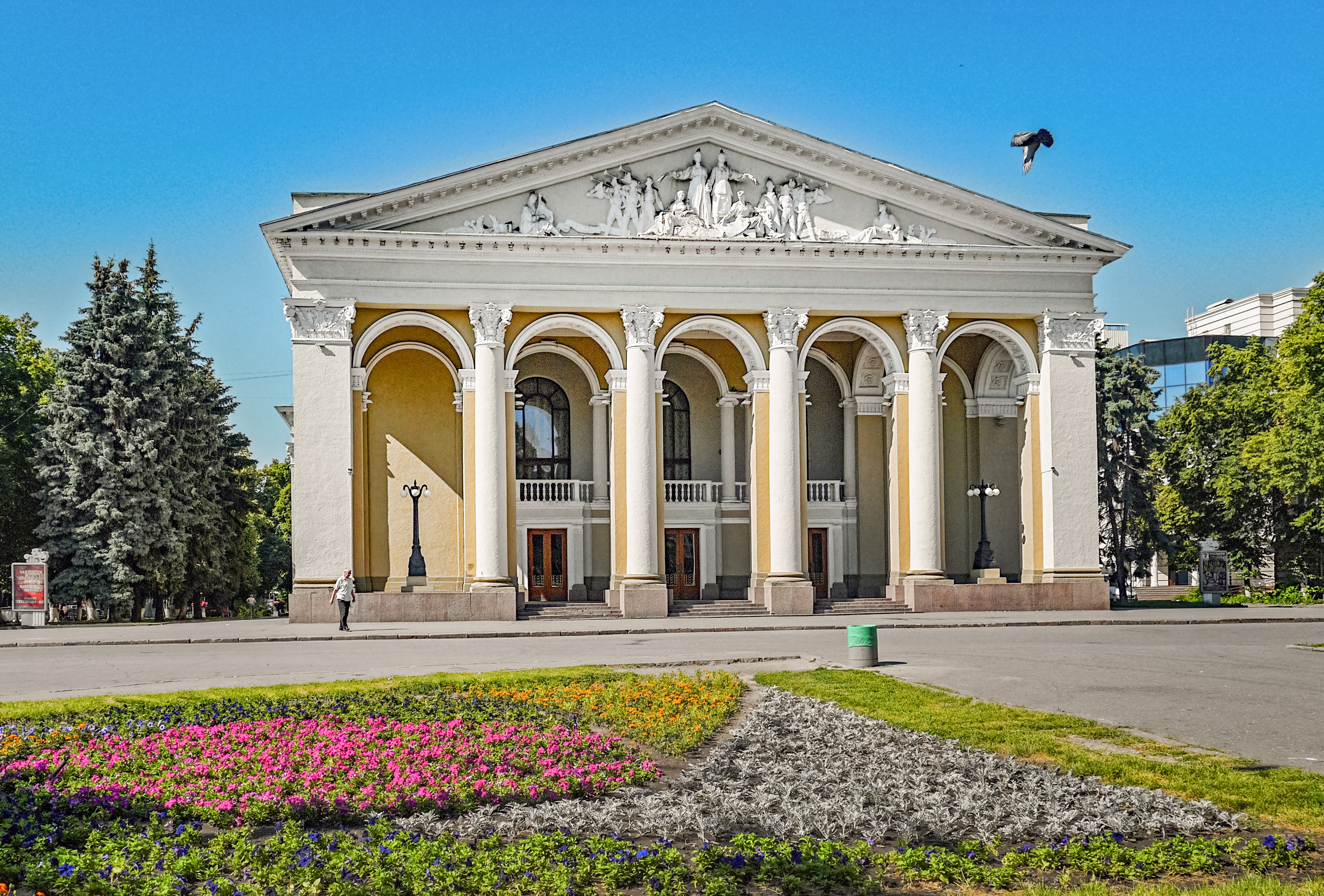
Poltava Theatre of Music and Drama

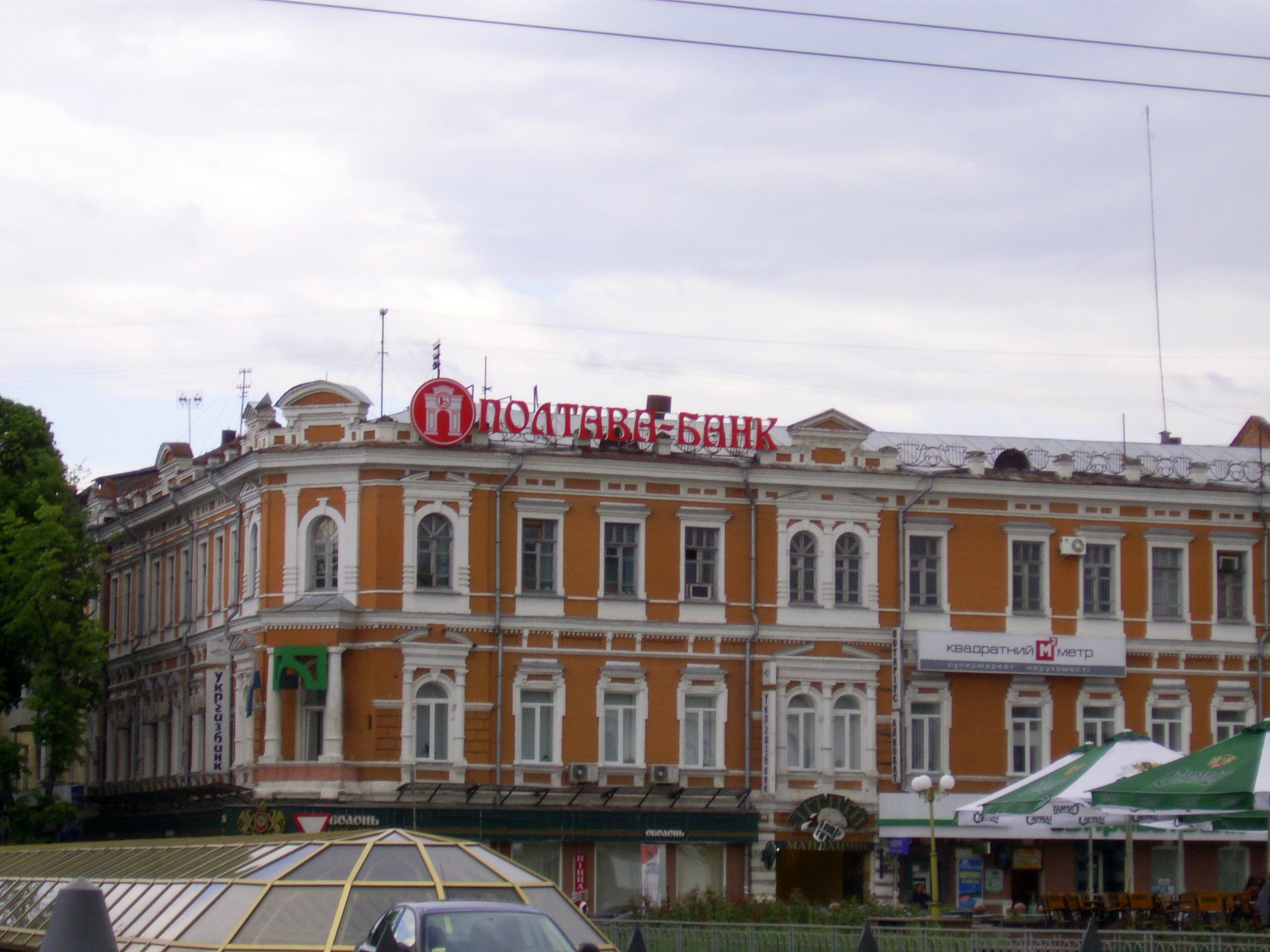
Merchant Ginzburg's "Grand Hotel"

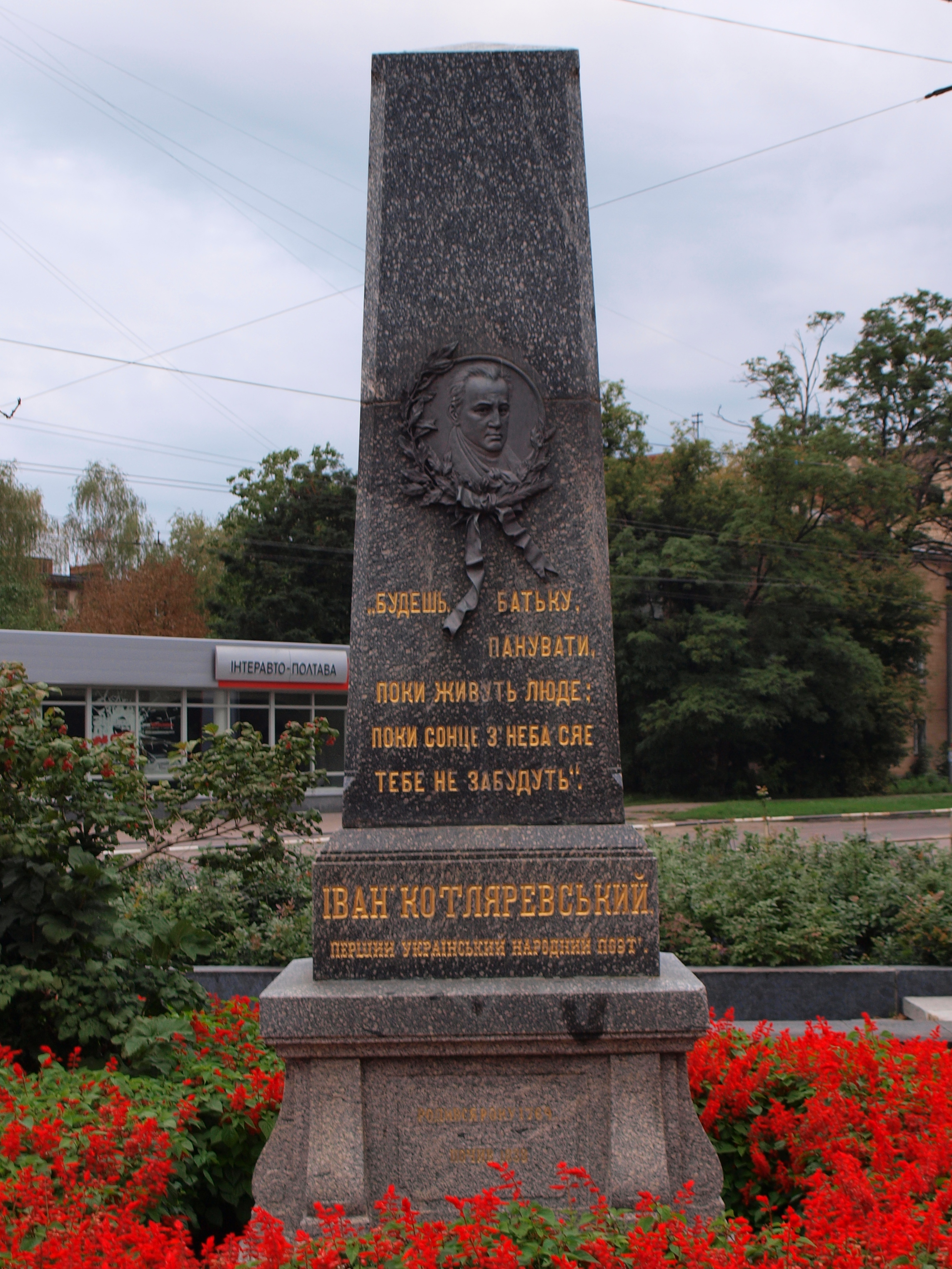
Obelisk at Ivan Kotlyarevsky's grave

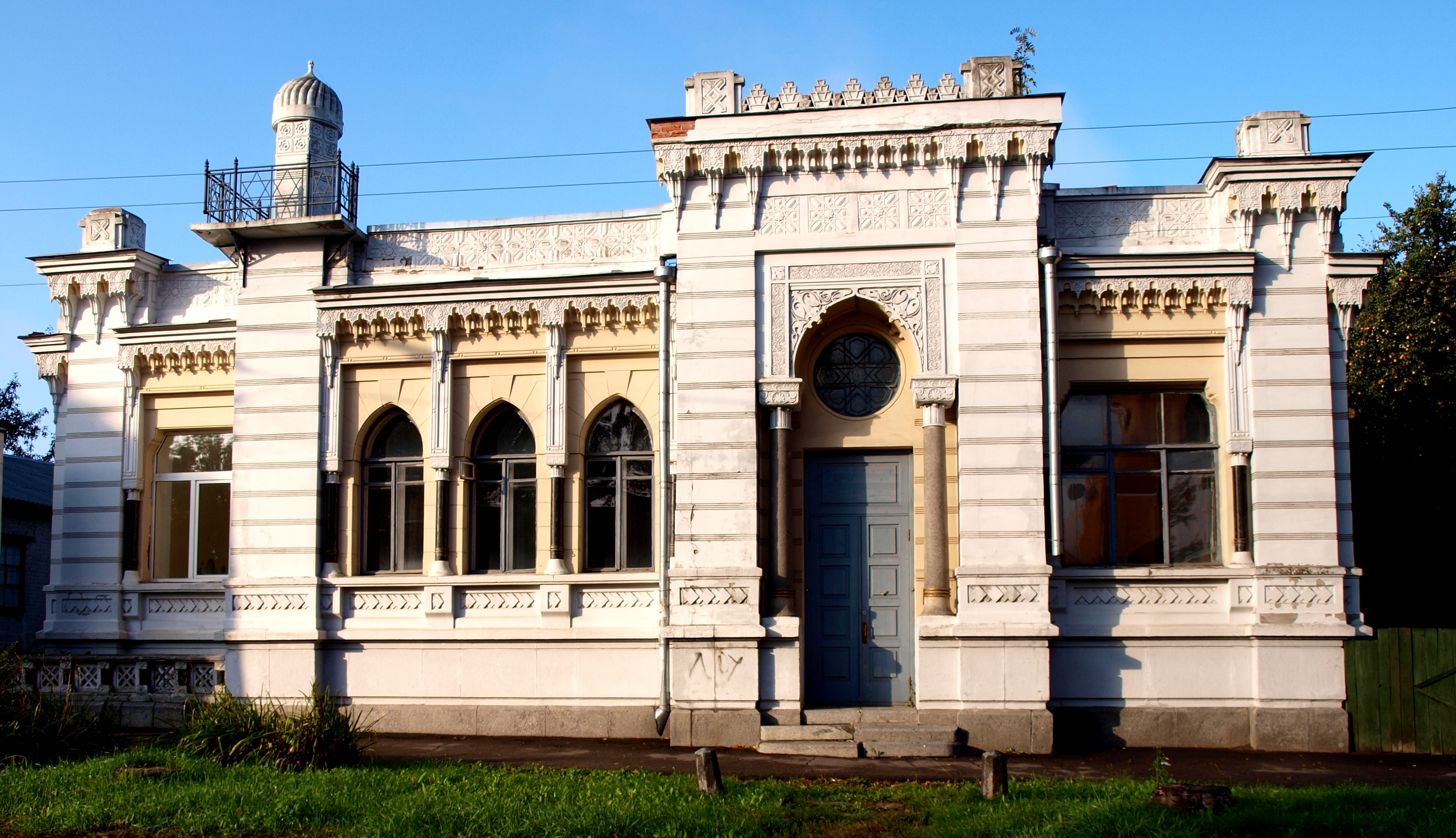
Moorish-styled mansion of Bakhmatsky

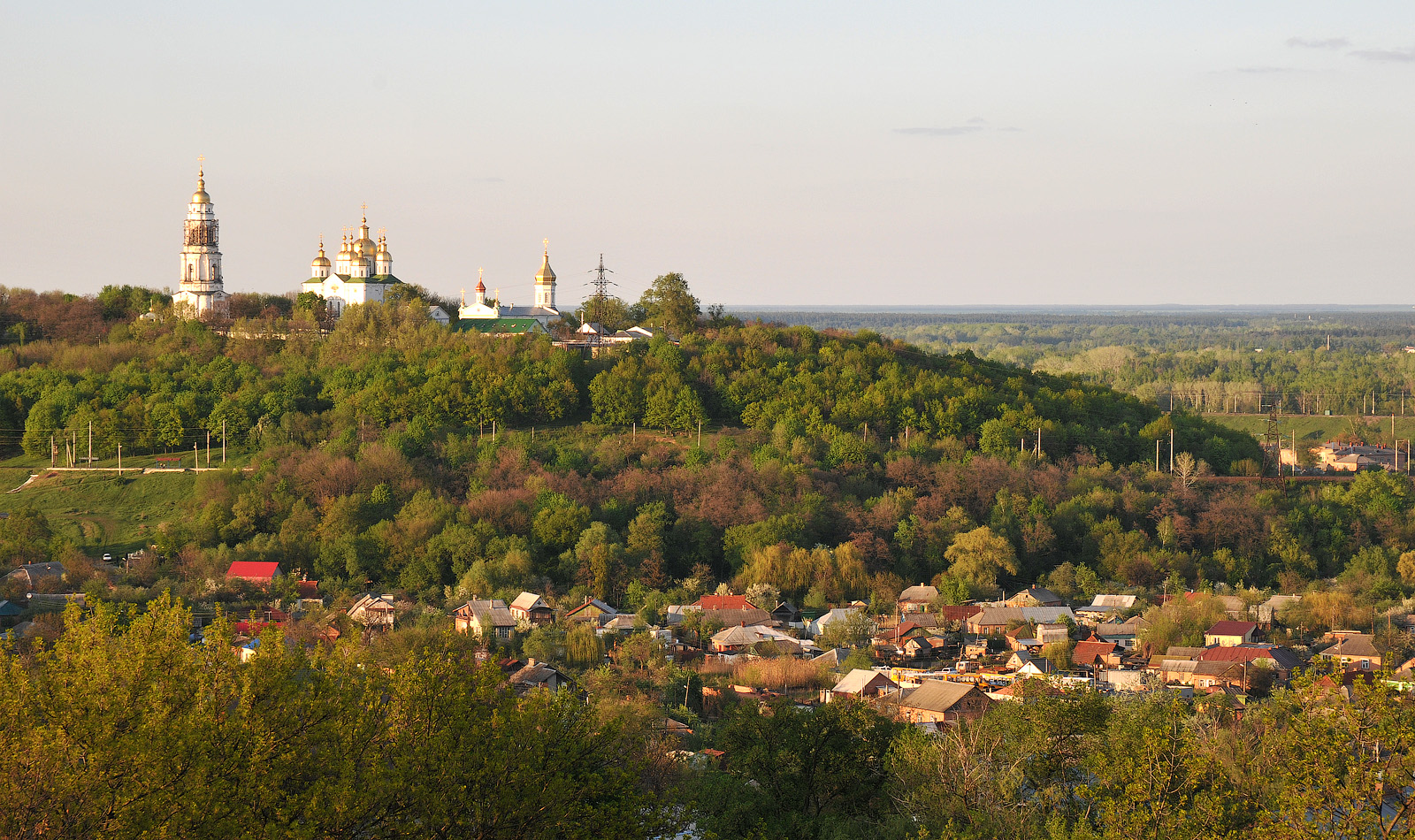
Exaltation of the Cross nunnery

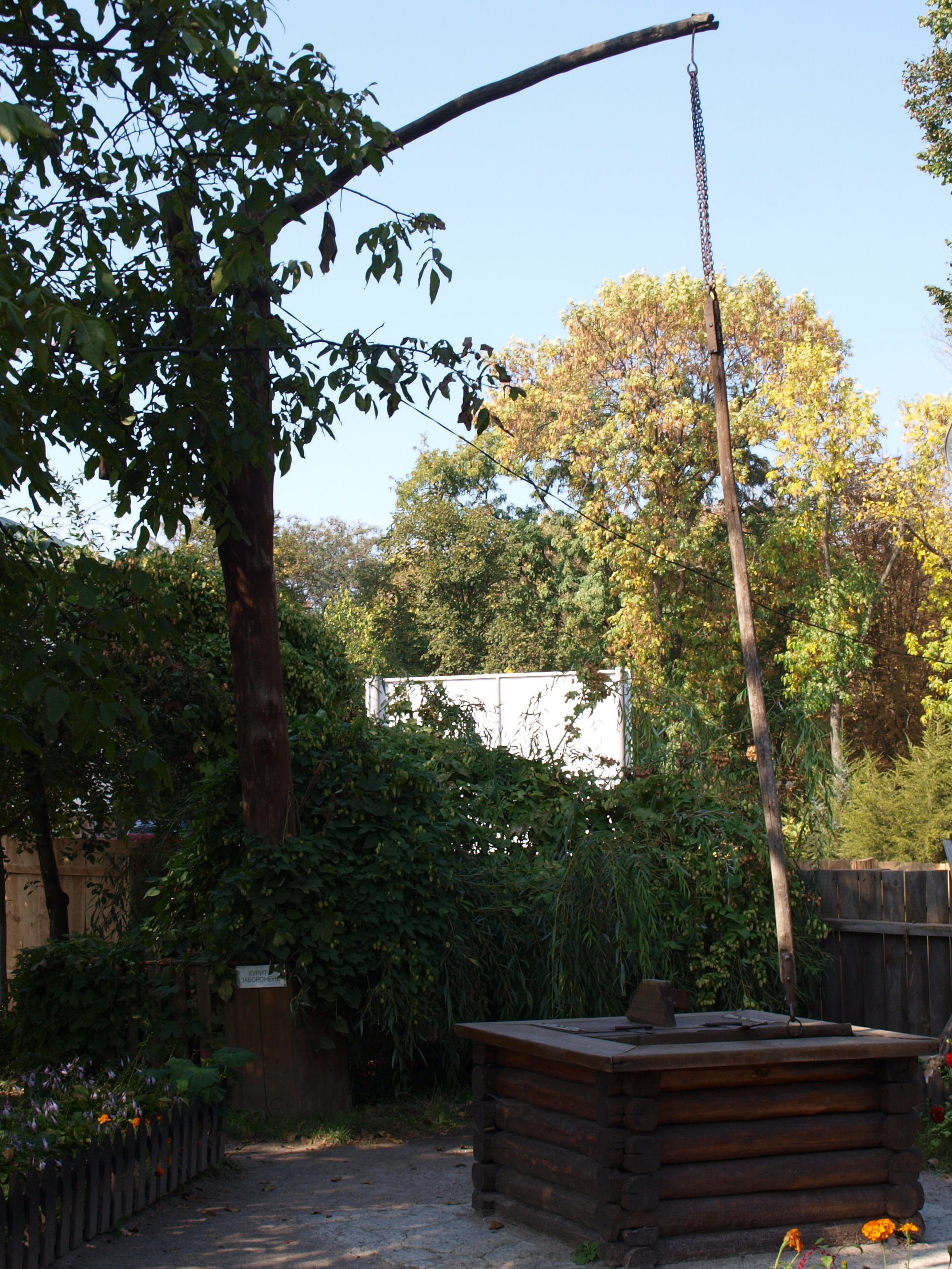
Traditional Ukrainian well, krynytsia (Kotlyarevsky's estate)

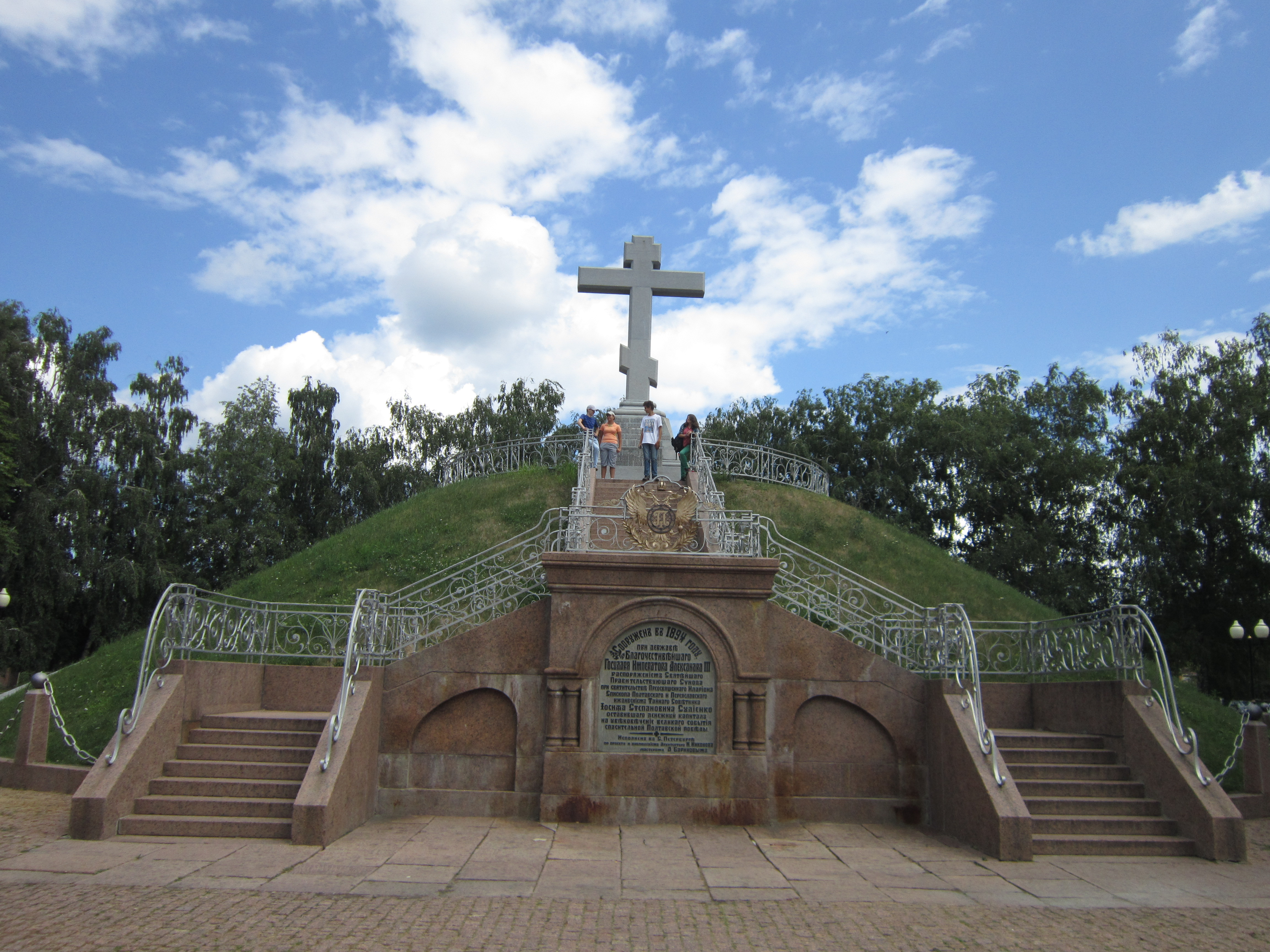
Mass burial of 1345 Russian soldiers (perished at the Battle of Poltava)

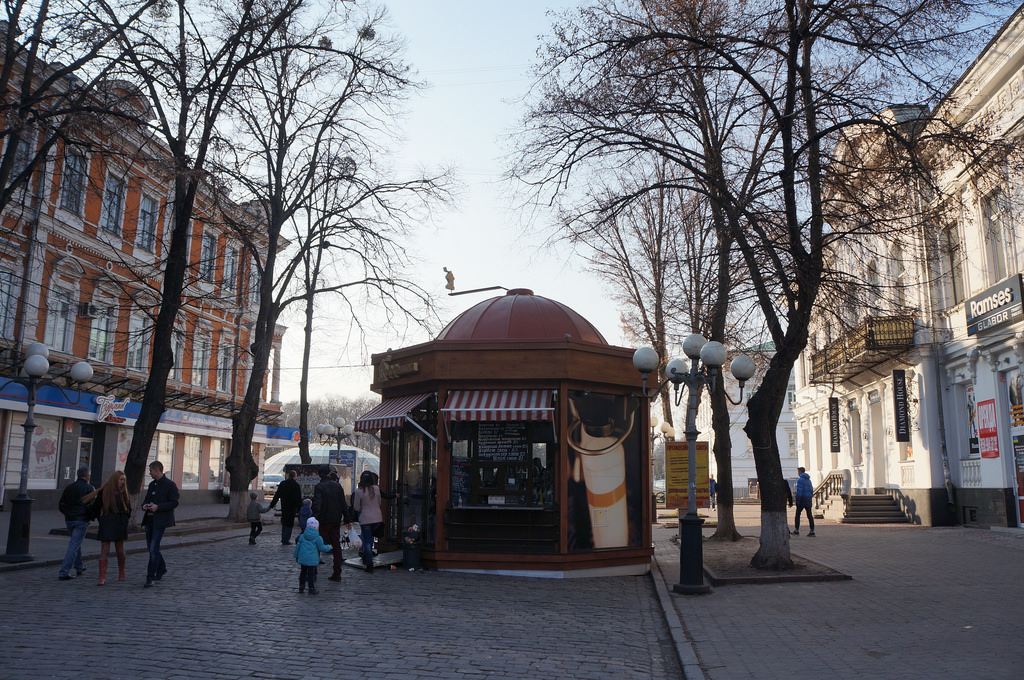
Main pedestrian street of Poltava

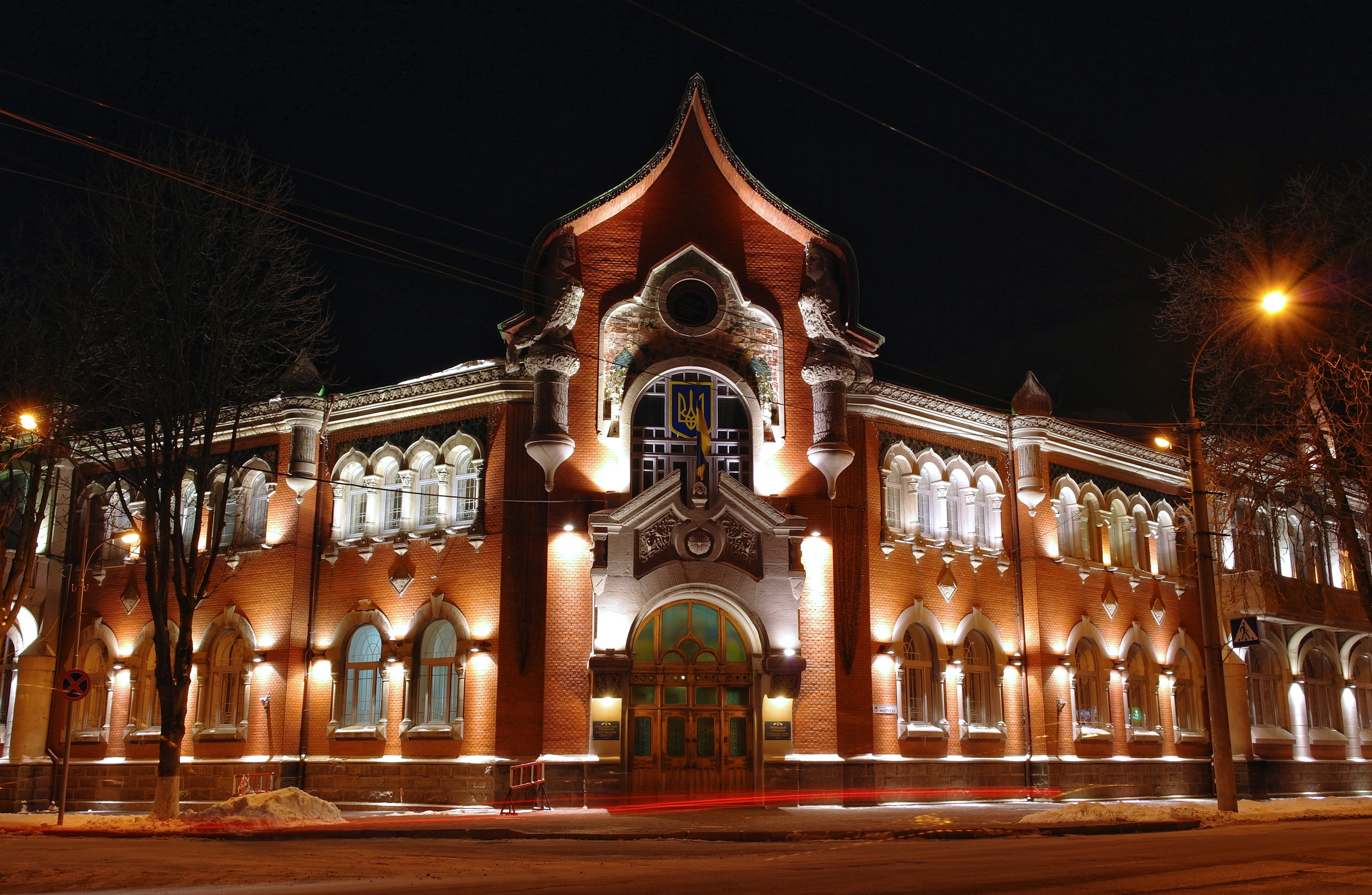
State security office

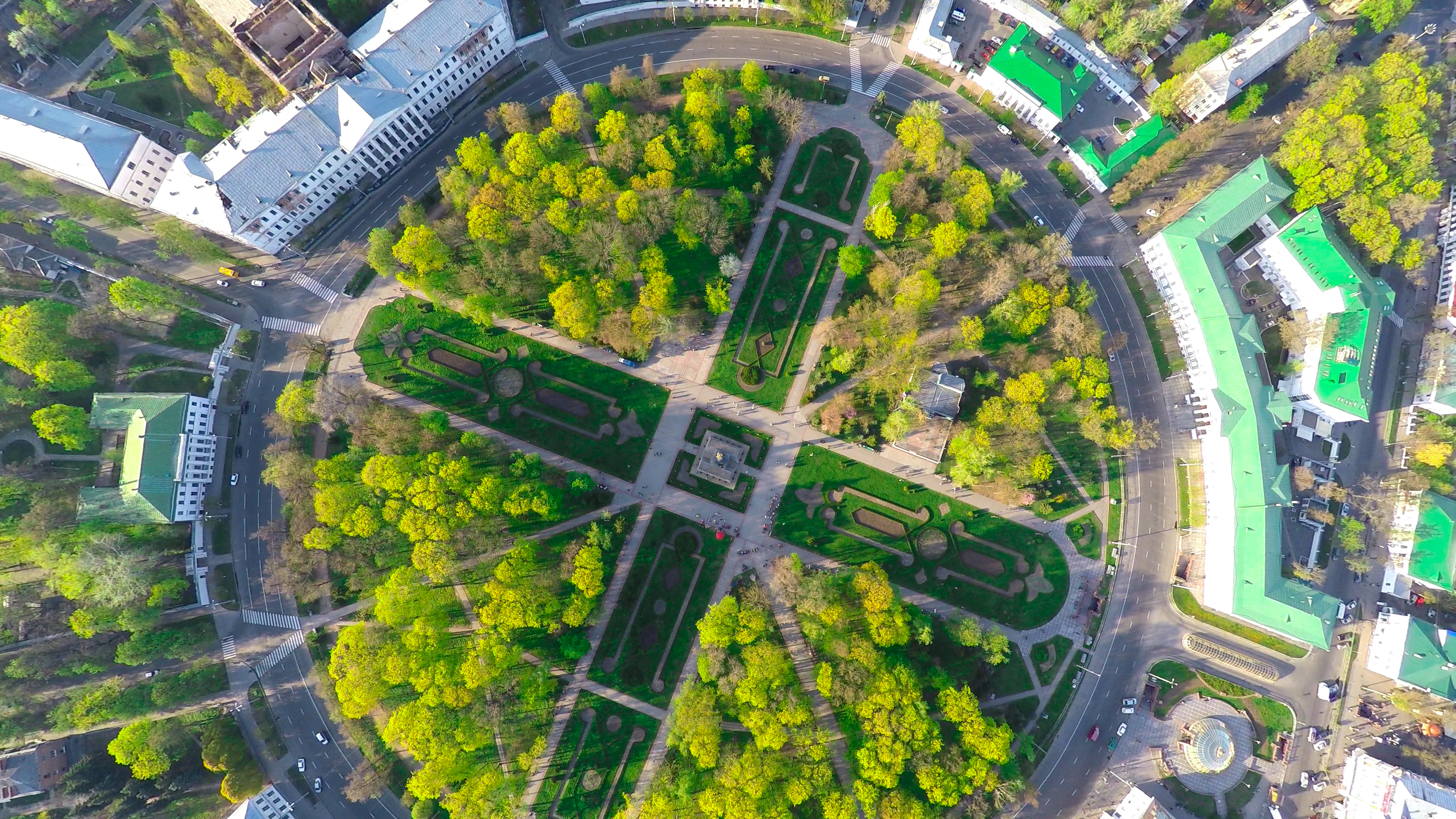
Round square in central Poltava

== Bibliography ==
- Voloshyn, Iurii (2023). "Population Distribution of the City of Poltava in the Second Half of the Eighteenth Century by Age, Sex, and Marital Status". In Kohut, Zenon (ed.). Eighteenth-Century Ukraine: New Perspectives on Social, Cultural, and Intellectual History. McGill–Queen's University Press. ISBN 978-0-2280-1743-1.
