= Poltava urban hromada =

Urban hromada of Poltava Oblast, Ukraine

Poltava urban hromada Полтавська міська громада
- Hromada
- Coat of arms
- Interactive map of Poltava urban hromada
- Country: Ukraine
- Oblast: Poltava Oblast
- Raion: Poltava Raion
- Admin. center: Poltava

Area
  - Total: 547.8 km^{2} (211.5 sq mi)

Population (2020)
  - Total: 312 814
  - Density: 0.570/km^{2} (1.48/sq mi)
- CATOTTG code: UA53080370000025447
- Settlements: 56
- Cities: 1
- Villages: 55
- Website: rada-poltava.gov.ua

Poltava urban territorial hromada (Ukrainian: Полтавська міська територіальна громада, romanized: Poltavska miska terytorialna hromada) is one of the hromadas of Ukraine, located in Poltava Raion, Poltava Oblast. Its administrative centre is the city of Poltava.

The hromada has a total area of 548.9 km^{2} (211.9 mi^{2}), and a population of 638,519 (as of 2023).

== Composition ==
In addition to one city (Poltava), there are 55 villages within the hromada:

- Abazivka
- Andriivka
- Andrushky
- Bershatske
- Biolohichne
- Bochanivka
- Brychkivka
- Buhaivka
- Davydivka
- Chervona Dolyna
- Chornohlazivka
- Dolyna
- Hlukhove
- Hovtvianchyk
- Hozhuly
- Hrabynivka
- Hrynivka
- Hutyrivka
- Ivashky
- Kaplunivka
- Karpusi
- Keleberdivka
- Kovalivka
- Kostochky
- Lavryky
- Lozivka
- Makartsivka
- Makukhivka
- Myltsi
- Nosivka
- Ochkanivka
- Olepiry
- Palchykivka
- Patlaivka
- Petrivka
- Rozhaivka
- Semianivka
- Shostaky
- Solomakhivka
- Sosnivka
- Suprunivka
- Takhtaulove
- Ternivshchyna
- Tryrohove
- Tsyhanske
- Umantsivka
- Valok
- Verkholy
- Vytivka
- Yatsynova Slobidka
- Yizhakivka
- Zaliznychne
- Zaturyne
- Zhuky
- Zorivka
