= Rozsoshentsi =

Village in Poltava Oblast, Ukraine

Rozsoshentsi Розсошенці
- Village
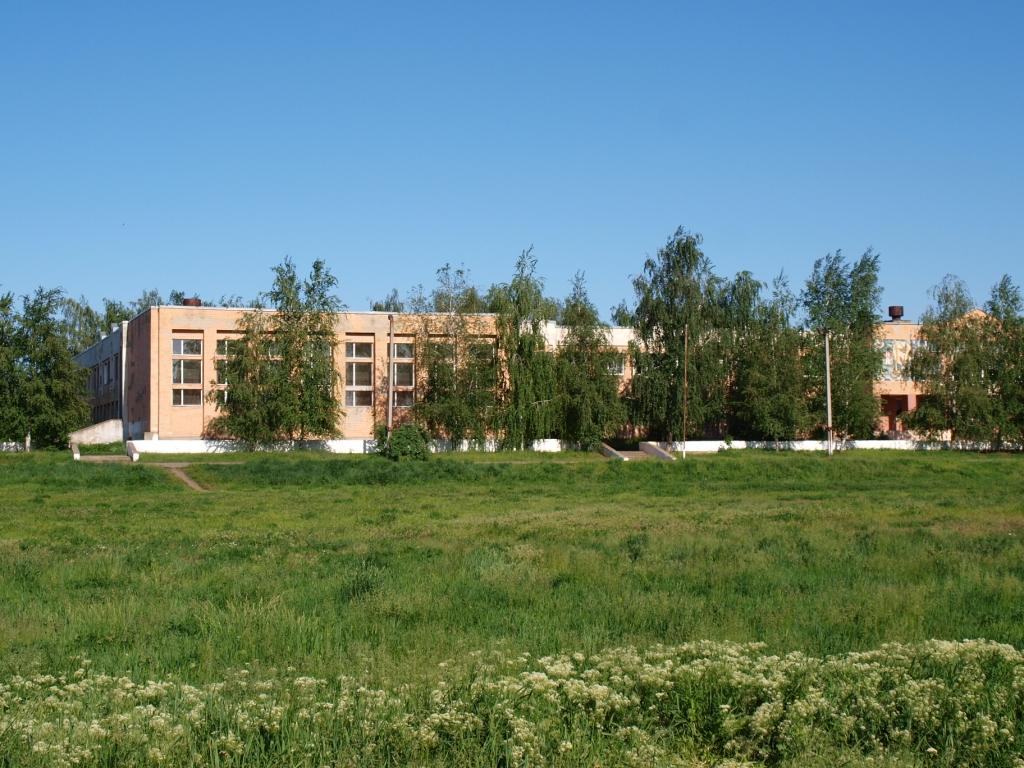

- Location of Rozsoshentsi Rozsoshentsi (Poltava Oblast)
- Coordinates: 49°32′21″N 34°30′14″E
- Country: Ukraine
- Oblast: Poltava Oblast
- Raion: Poltava Raion
- Hromada: Shcherbani rural hromada
- Elevation: 155 m (509 ft)

Population (2004)
  - Total: 6,731
- Time zone: UTC+2 (EET)
  - Summer (DST): UTC+3 (EEST)
- Postal code: 38751
- Area code: +380 532

Rozsoshentsi (Ukrainian: Розсошенці) is a village in Poltava Raion, Poltava Oblast, Ukraine. It belongs to Shcherbani rural hromada, one of the hromadas of Ukraine.

== Demographics ==
According to the 1989 census, the population of Rozsoshentsi was 6,115, of which 2,961 were men and 3,154 were women. According to the 2001 census, 6,639 people lived in the village.

=== Languages ===
Native language as of the Ukrainian Census of 2001:

Language	Percentage
Ukrainian	92.96 %
Russian	6.82 %
Belarusian	0.12 %
Armenian	0.04 %
