= Kopyly =

Rural locality in Poltava Oblast, Ukraine

Kopyly Копили
- Village
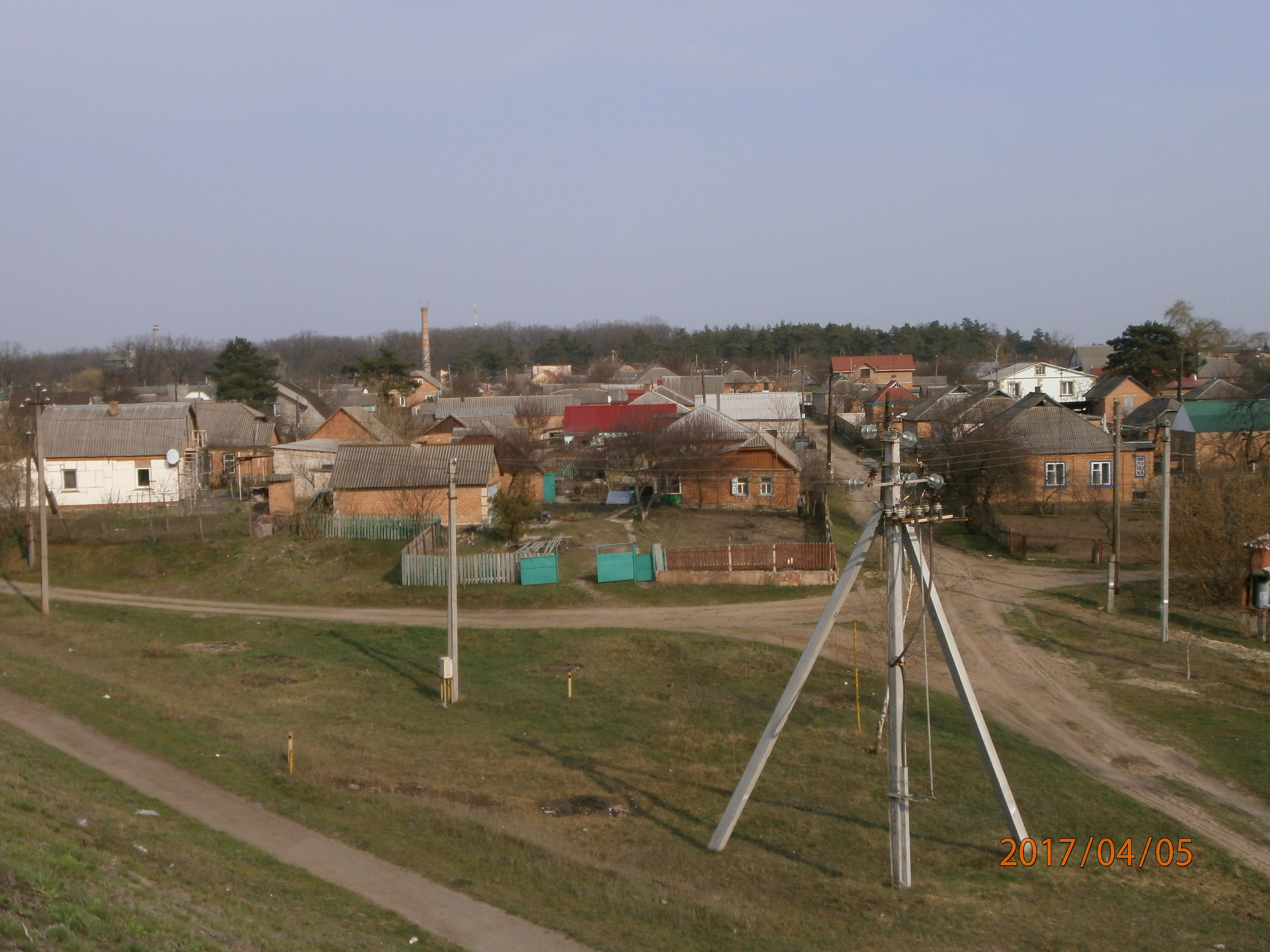
- Part of the village

- Location in Ukraine Kopyly (Poltava Oblast)
- Coordinates: 49°33′33″N 34°36′49″E
- Country: Ukraine
- Oblast: Poltava Oblast
- Raion: Poltava Raion
- Village founded: ?

Area
  - Total: 2.974 km^{2} (1.148 sq mi)
- Elevation: 91 m (299 ft)

Population (2001)
  - Total: 2,525
  - Density: 849.0/km^{2} (2,199/sq mi)
- Time zone: UTC+2 (EET)
  - Summer (DST): UTC+3 (EEST)
- Postal code: 38761
- Area code: +380 532

Kopyly (Ukrainian: Копили) is a village in Poltava Raion, Poltava Oblast, Ukraine. It belongs to Tereshky rural hromada, one of the hromadas of Ukraine. The village has a population of 2,525.

The village is located 3 km southeast of Poltava, within Tereshky village council, at the E 40 chaussee and at the railway line Poltava—Krasnohrad. The largest body of water in the neighbourhood is Vorskla river. Its biggest tributary, the Kolomak, flows into it near the village.

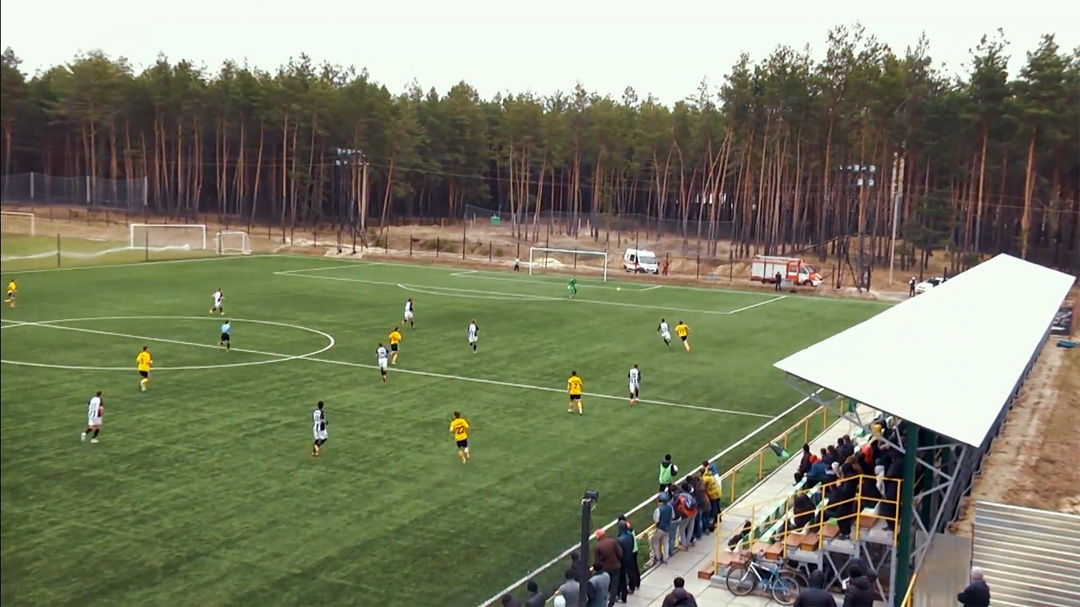
Suburban training field of FC Poltava
