= Kobeliaky Raion =

Former subdivision of Poltava Oblast, Ukraine

Kobeliaky Raion Кобеляцький район
- Raion
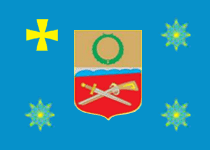
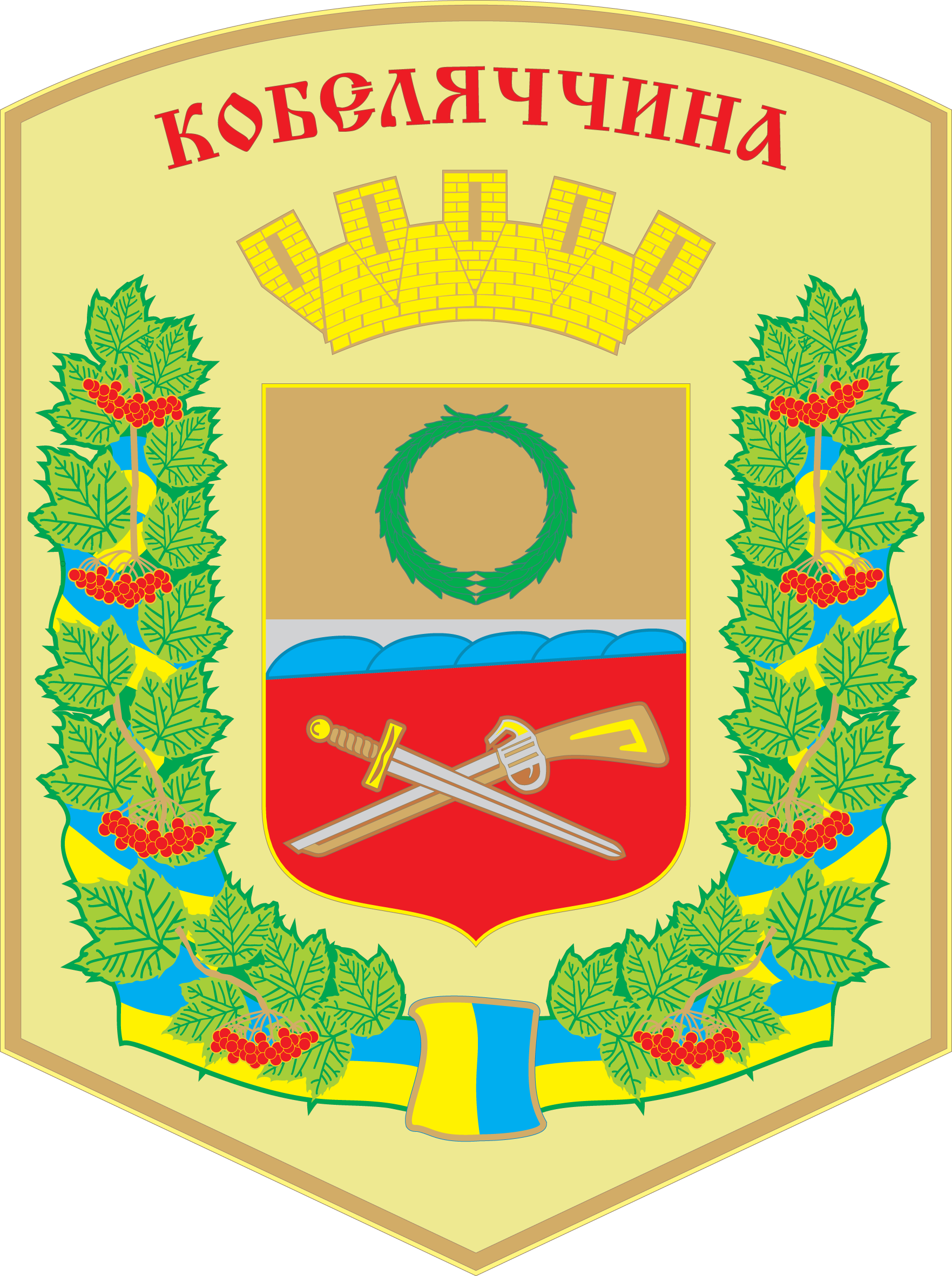
- Flag Coat of arms

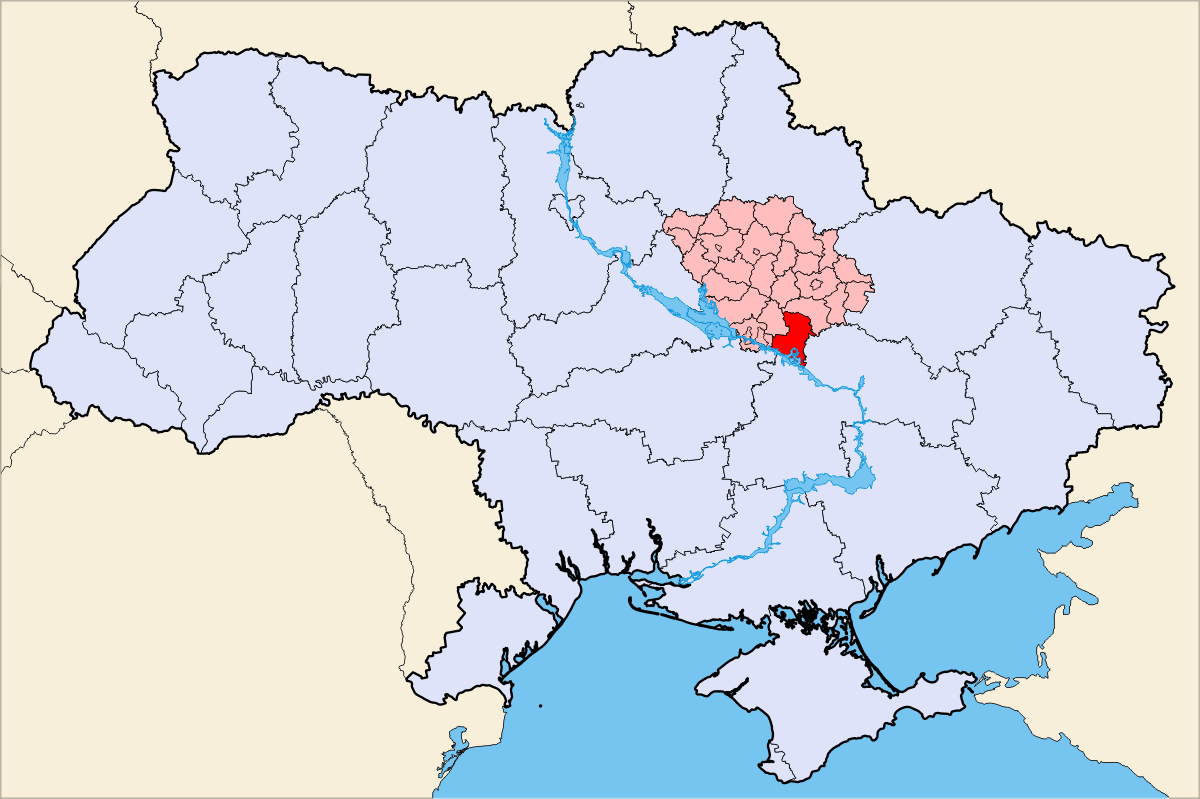
- Coordinates: 49°3′4.3842″N 34°9′38.0442″E
- Country: Ukraine
- Oblast: Poltava Oblast
- Established: 7 March 1923
- Disestablished: 18 July 2020
- Admin. center: Kobeliaky
- Subdivisions: List: — city councils; — settlement councils; — rural councils; Number of localities: — cities; — urban-type settlements; 99 — villages; — rural settlements

Area
  - Total: 1,823 km^{2} (704 sq mi)

Population (2020)
  - Total: 40,172
  - Density: 22.04/km^{2} (57.07/sq mi)
- Time zone: UTC+02:00 (EET)
  - Summer (DST): UTC+03:00 (EEST)
- Area code: +380
- Website: Official homepage

Kobeliaky Raion (Ukrainian: Кобеляцький район, romanized: Kobeljac'kyj rajon) was a raion (district) in Poltava Oblast in central Ukraine. The raion's administrative center was the city of Kobeliaky. The raion was abolished and its territory was merged into Poltava Raion on 18 July 2020 as part of the administrative reform of Ukraine, which reduced the number of raions of Poltava Oblast to four. The last estimate of the raion population was 40,172 (2020 est.)

Important rivers within the Kobeliatskyi Raion included the Dnieper and the Vorskla. The raion was established on March 7, 1923.

At the time of disestablishment, the raion consisted of two hromadas:

- Bilyky settlement hromada with the administration in the urban-type settlement of Bilyky;
- Kobeliaky urban hromada with the administration in Kobeliaky.

== Settlements ==
- Brodshchyna
- Butenky
- Vasylivka
- Vilkhuvatka
- Hryhoro-Bryhadyrivka
- Dashkivka
- Dryshyna Hreblia
- Zhuky
- Zolotarivka
- Ivanivka
- Kanavy
- Kirove
- Komendantivka
- Krasne
- Kunivka
- Luchky
- Markivka
- Ozera
- Orlyk
- Pidhora
- Radianske
- Svitlohirske
- Sukhynivka
- Chervoni Kvity
- Chorbivka
- Shenhury
