= Chutove =

Rural locality in Poltava Oblast, Ukraine

Chutove Чутове
- Rural settlement
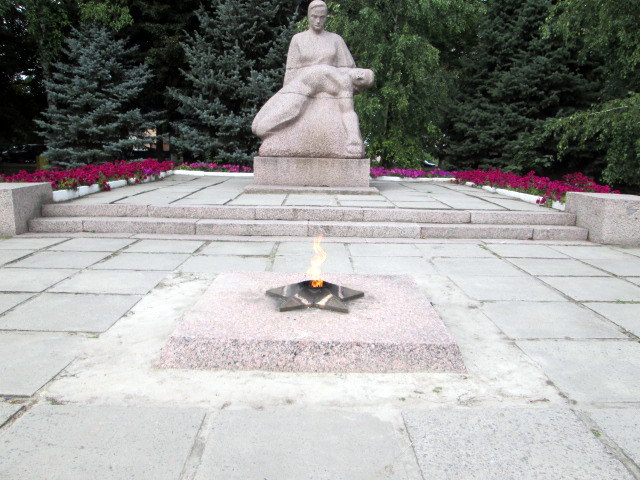

- Location in Poltava Oblast Location in Ukraine
- Country: Ukraine
- Oblast: Poltava Oblast
- Raion: Poltava Raion

Population (2022)
  - Total: 6,024
- Time zone: UTC+2 (EET)
  - Summer (DST): UTC+3 (EEST)

Chutove (Ukrainian: Чутове, Russian: Чутово) is a rural settlement in Poltava Raion of Poltava Oblast in Ukraine. In is located on the Kolomak, the left tributary of the Vorskla, in the drainage basin of the Dnieper. Chutove hosts the administration of Chutove settlement hromada, one of the hromadas of Ukraine. Population: 6,024 (2022 estimate).

== History ==
Until 18 July 2020, Chutove was the administrative center of Chutove Raion. The raion was abolished in July 2020 as part of the administrative reform of Ukraine, which reduced the number of raions of Poltava Oblast to four. The area of Chutove Raion was merged into Poltava Raion.

Until 26 January 2024, Chutove was designated urban-type settlement. On this day, a new law entered into force which abolished this status, and Chutove became a rural settlement.

== Economy ==
=== Transportation ===
The settlement is on Highway M03 connecting Kyiv and Kharkiv via Poltava.

The closest railway station is in Skorokhodove, on the railway connecting Poltava and Kharkiv.
