= Vorskla (newspaper) =

Ukrainian newspaper

Vorskla is a local Ukrainian newspaper, published from Velyka Pysarivka, near Okhtyrka in Sumy Oblast.

The newspaper is named for the Vorskla river, and was founded in 1930. As of 2024 it is published weekly. Its motto is "a newspaper with a Ukrainian heart", and the owner and editor in chief, Oleksiy Pasyuha, explained in 2024 how important that was. Okhtyrka borders Russia, and much of the news the local people saw on TV was Russian propaganda. Few people in the region have access to the internet, he said, and since the 2022 Russian invasion, when the paper temporarily stopped publication, it has been difficult for them to access Ukrainian news.

By 2023, the newspaper was being published again, with a new section ("Interesting Stories About Pets"), and with an option for people outside the country or the region to pay for a subscription to go to a person in the region.

The newspaper continued even after increased shelling (and the destruction of the editorial office) following the 2024 Kursk offensive. The Russians shelled the office twice in 2024, on 16 February and again on 14 March. The number of subscriptions increased from 2000 to 2500, and the paper is printed with financial support from abroad, particularly from the International Fund for Public Interest Media.
