= Bilyky =

Rural locality in Poltava Oblast, Ukraine

Bilyky Білики
- Rural settlement
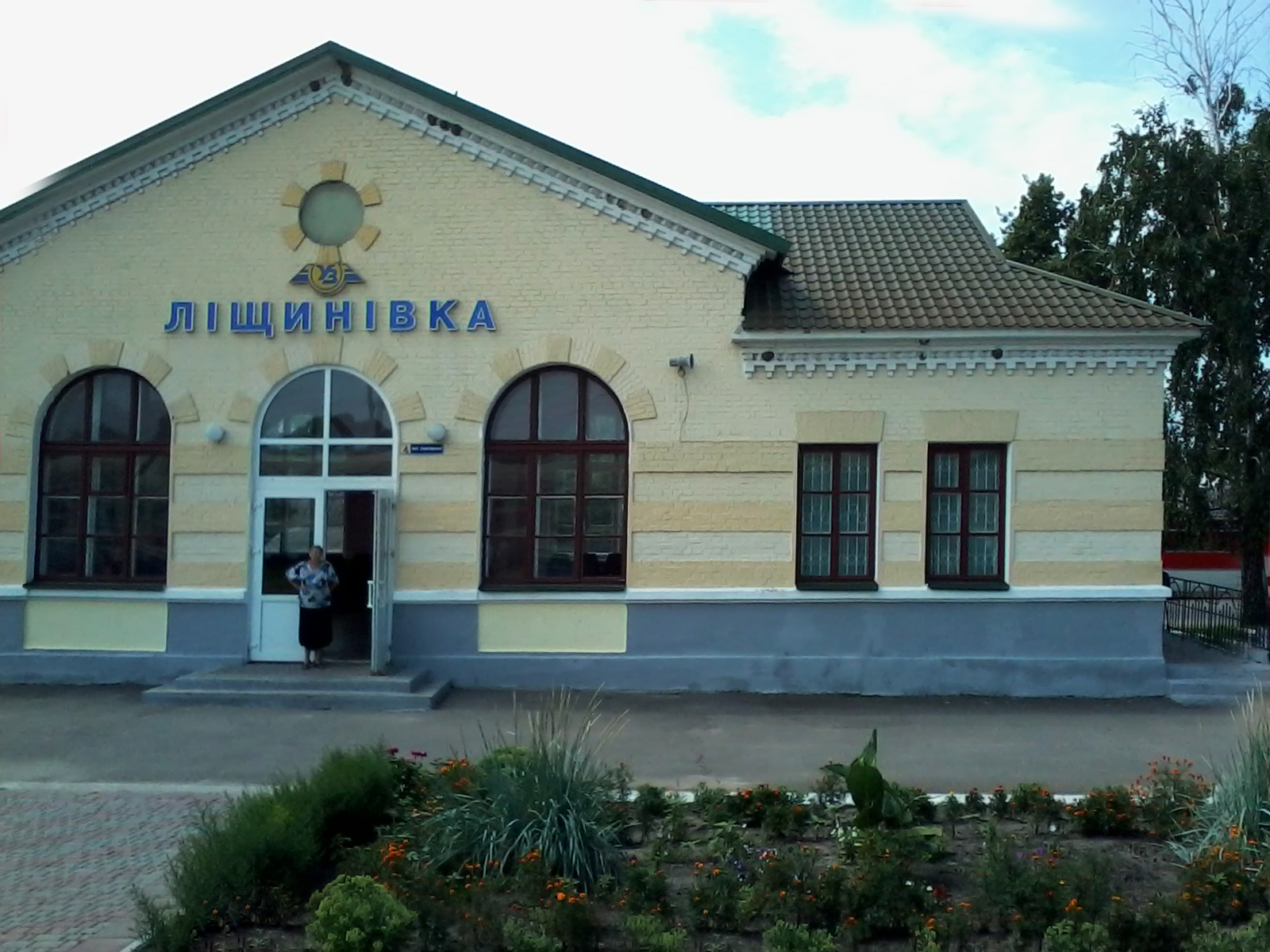

- Location in Poltava Oblast Location in Ukraine
- Country: Ukraine
- Oblast: Poltava Oblast
- Raion: Poltava Raion

Population (2022)
  - Total: 4,736
- Time zone: UTC+2 (EET)
  - Summer (DST): UTC+3 (EEST)

Bilyky (Ukrainian: Білики; Russian: Белики) is a rural settlement in Poltava Raion, Poltava Oblast, Ukraine. It is located on the right bank of the Vorskla, a left tributary of the Dnieper. Bilyky hosts the administration of Bilyky settlement hromada, one of the hromadas of Ukraine. Population: 4,736 (2022 estimate).

== History ==
Until 18 July 2020, Bilyky belonged to Kobeliaky Raion. The raion was abolished in July 2020 as part of the administrative reform of Ukraine, which reduced the number of raions of Poltava Oblast to four. The area of Kobeliaky Raion was merged into Poltava Raion.

Until 26 January 2024, Bilyky was designated urban-type settlement. On this day, a new law entered into force which abolished this status, and Bilyky became a rural settlement.

== Economy ==
=== Transportation ===
To the north, Bilyky has access to the Highway M22 connecting Poltava with Oleksandriia via Kremenchuk. To the south, it has road connections with Kobeliaky.

Lishchynivka railway station is located in Bilyky. It is on the railway which connects Poltava and Kremenchuk. There is infrequent passenger traffic.
