= Velyka Pysarivka =

Rural locality in Sumy Oblast, Ukraine

Velyka Pysarivka Велика Писарівка
- Rural settlement
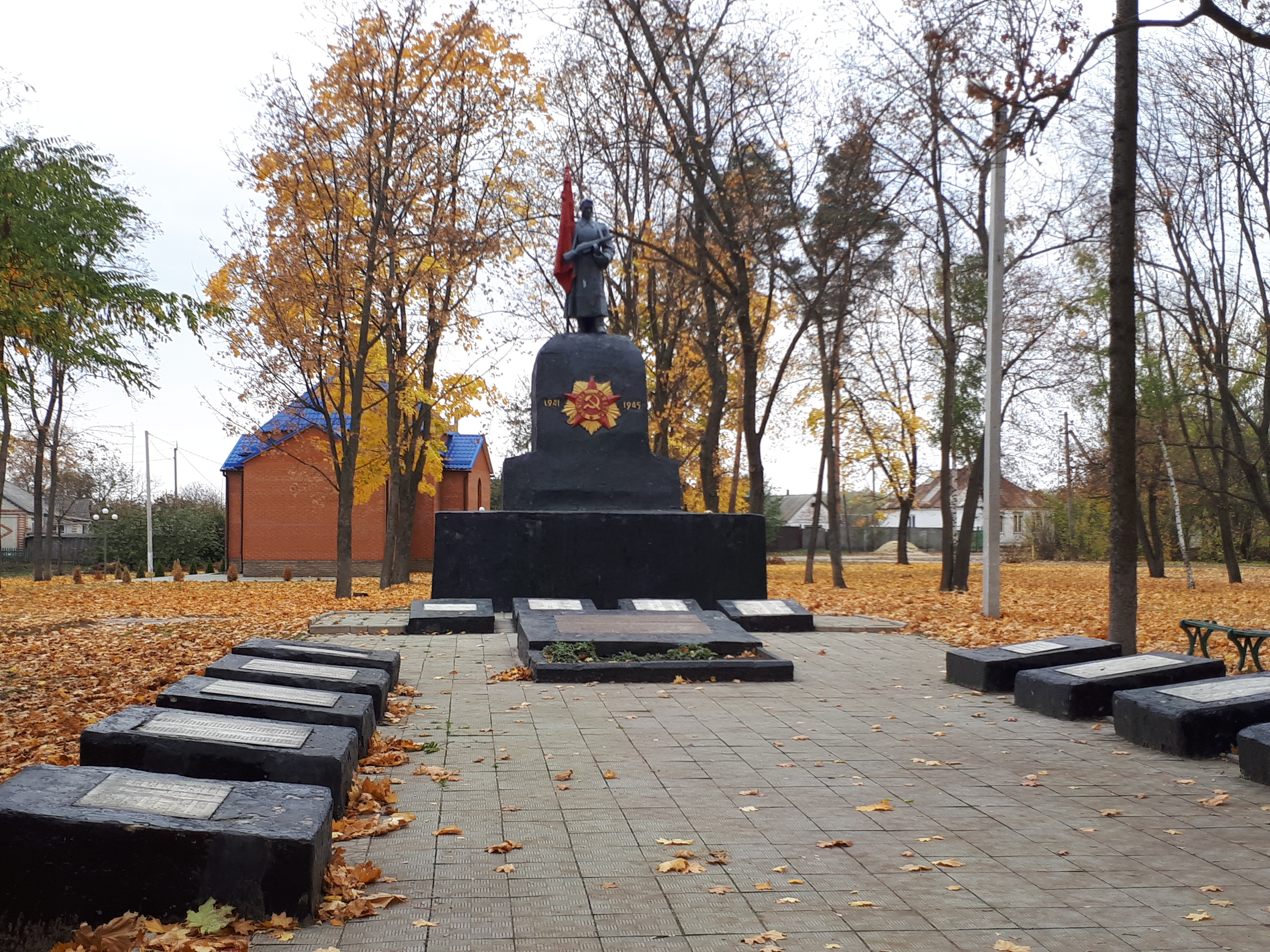
- Mass grave of the fallen Red Army soldiers.

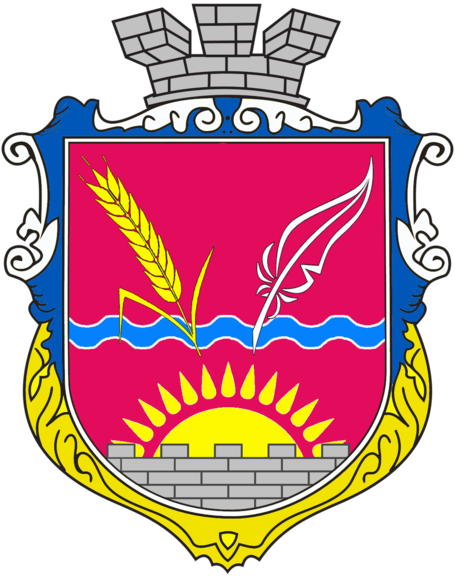
- Flag Coat of arms

- Location in Sumy Oblast Location in Ukraine
- Coordinates: 50°25′34″N 35°28′55″E
- Country: Ukraine
- Oblast: Sumy Oblast
- Raion: Okhtyrka Raion
- Hromada: Velyka Pysarivka settlement hromada

Area
  - Total: 8.71212 km^{2} (3.36377 sq mi)

Population (2022)
  - Total: 3,928
  - Density: 450.9/km^{2} (1,168/sq mi)
- Time zone: UTC+2 (EET)
  - Summer (DST): UTC+3 (EEST)
- Post Code: 42800
- Area code: +380 5457

Velyka Pysarivka (Ukrainian: Велика Писарівка [ʋeˈɫɪkɐ ˈpɪsɐrʲiu̯kɐ]; Russian: Великая Писаревка) is a rural settlement in Sumy Oblast, northeastern Ukraine. It was formerly the administrative center of Velyka Pysarivka Raion, but is now administered within Okhtyrka Raion. It is located close to the border with Russia, on the left bank of the Vorskla, a tributary of the Dnieper. Population: 3,928 (2022 estimate), 90 (2026 estimate).

== History ==
During World War II, Velyka Pisarivka was occupied by Nazi troops in October 1941. During the occupation, the Nazis executed 36 villagers while 176 were deported to Germany for forced labour. After a failed attempt by Soviet soldiers in early 1943, the village was finally liberated in August 1943.

Until 26 January 2024, Velyka Pysarivka was designated urban-type settlement. On this day, a new law entered into force which abolished this status, and Velyka Pysarivka became a rural settlement.

=== 2022 Russian invasion ===
On 24 February, as part of the 2022 Russian invasion of Ukraine, two Russian tank columns crossed the international border at Grayvoron and Popivka, reaching Velyka Pysarivka by 08:00. The next day, according to the Sumy Oblast governor Dmytro Zhyvytskyi, fighting began at 07:30 on the outskirts of the Okhtyrka in the direction of Velyka Pysarivka. According to Ukrainian state employee Anton Herashchenko, Russian forces could not occupy Okhtyrka and retreated, leaving tanks and equipment.

The Russian military repeatedly bombarded Velyka Pysarivka throughout March 2022. Shelling was reported in the settlement on 5 March and 13 March.

On 17 March 2024, according to the head of local community, the center of Velyka Pysarivka was destroyed by Russian strikes. The citizens were asked to evacuate from the settlement.

== Economy ==
=== Transportation ===
The settlement is connected by roads with Bohodukhiv, with Sumy via Krasnopillia, and across the border with Grayvoron in Russia.

The closest railway station is in Bohodukhiv, on the railway connecting Kharkiv and Sumy.
