= Novi Sanzhary Raion =

Former subdivision of Poltava Oblast, Ukraine

Novi Sanzhary Raion Новосанжарський район
- Raion
- Flag Coat of arms

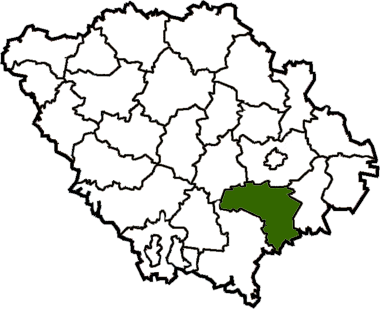
- Coordinates: 49°18′41.9718″N 34°27′31.0968″E
- Country: Ukraine
- Oblast: Poltava Oblast
- Established: 7 March 1923
- Disestablished: 18 July 2020
- Admin. center: Novi Sanzhary
- Subdivisions: List: — city councils; — settlement councils; — rural councils; Number of localities: — cities; — urban-type settlements; 76 — villages; — rural settlements

Government
  - Governor: Volodymyr Levytskiy

Area
  - Total: 1,300 km^{2} (500 sq mi)

Population (2020)
  - Total: 32,824
  - Density: 25/km^{2} (65/sq mi)
- Time zone: UTC+02:00 (EET)
  - Summer (DST): UTC+03:00 (EEST)
- Postal index: 39300—39373
- Area code: +380-5344
- Website: Official homepage

Novi Sanzhary Raion (Ukrainian: Новосанжарський район) was a raion (district) in Poltava Oblast of central Ukraine. The raion's administrative center was the urban-type settlement of Novi Sanzhary. The raion was abolished and its territory was merged into Poltava Raion on 18 July 2020 as part of the administrative reform of Ukraine, which reduced the number of raions of Poltava Oblast to four. The last estimate of the raion population was 32,824 (2020 est.)

At the time of disestablishment, the raion consisted of three hromadas:

- Drabynivka rural hromada with the administration in the selo of Drabynivka;
- Nekhvoroshcha rural hromada with the administration in the selo of Nekhvoroshcha;
- Novi Sanzhary settlement hromada with the administration in Novi Sanzhary.
