= Tereshky, Poltava Oblast =

Rural locality in Poltava Oblast, Ukraine

Tereshky Терешки
- Village
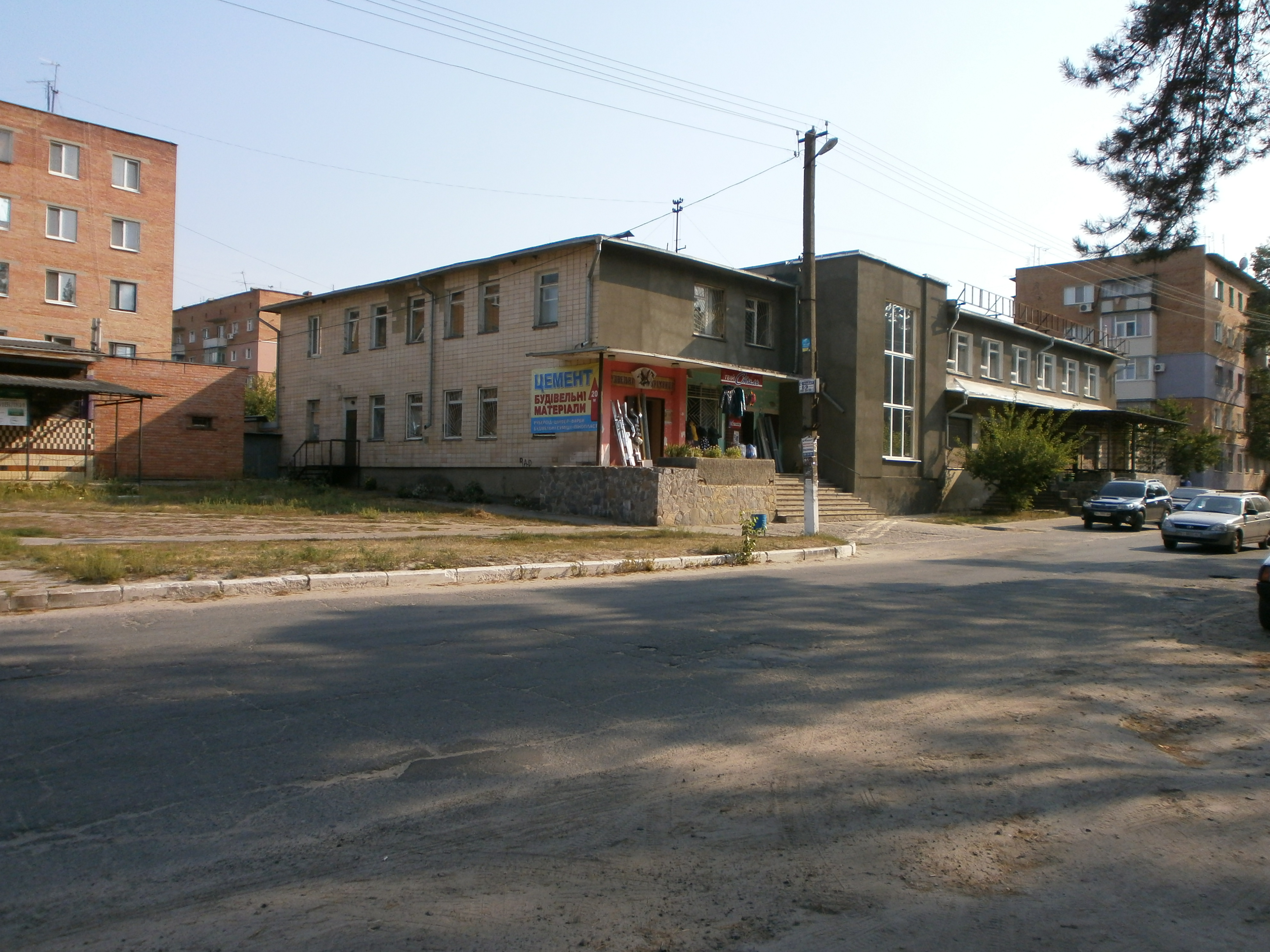
- In the village centre

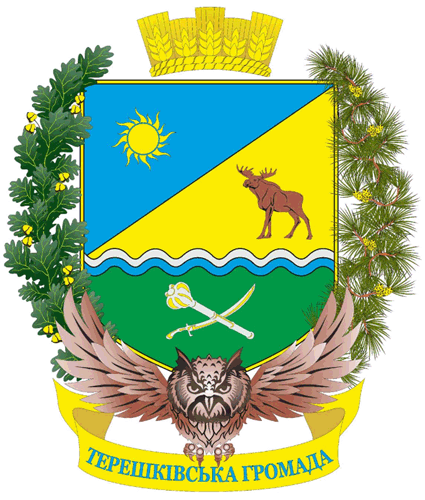
- Coat of arms
- Etymology: from Ukrainian given name Tereshko
- Location in Ukraine
- Coordinates: 49°33′07″N 34°37′06″E
- Country: Ukraine
- Oblast: Poltava Oblast
- Raion: Poltava Raion
- Hromada: Tereshky rural hromada
- First mention: the 2nd quarter of the 17th cent.

Area
  - Total: 2.078 km^{2} (0.802 sq mi)
- Elevation: 88 m (289 ft)

Population (2001)
  - Total: 2,450
  - Density: 1,180/km^{2} (3,050/sq mi)
- Time zone: UTC+2 (EET)
  - Summer (DST): UTC+3 (EEST)
- Postal code: 38762
- Area code: +380 532

Tereshky (Ukrainian: Терешки) is a municipality and village in Poltava Raion, Poltava Oblast, Ukraine. It hosts the administration of Tereshky rural hromada, one of the hromadas of Ukraine. The village itself has a population of 2,450 (2001) while the municipality consisting of two villages (Tereshky and Kopyly) has 4,742 inhabitants (2005).

The village is located 4 km southeast of Poltava on the railway line Poltava—Kremenchuk. It lies near Vorskla river.
