= Novi Sanzhary =

Rural locality in Poltava Oblast, Ukraine

Novi Sanzhary Нові Санжари
- Rural settlement
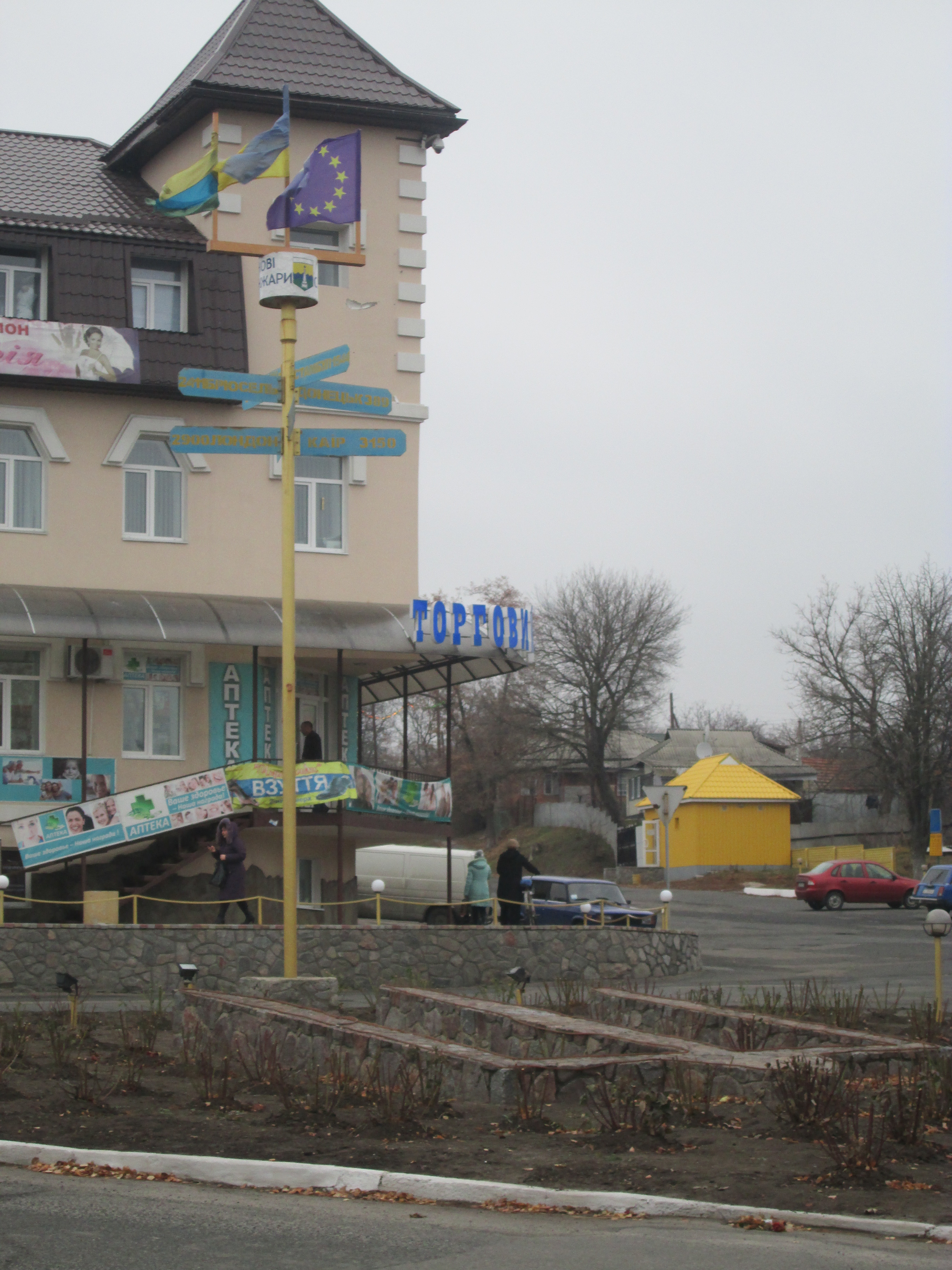
- The center of Novi Sanzhary

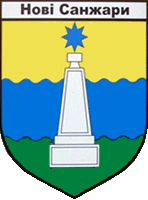
- Flag Coat of arms

- Location within Poltava Oblast Location within Ukraine
- Coordinates: 49°20′00″N 34°18′50″E
- Country: Ukraine
- Oblast: Poltava Oblast
- District: Poltava Raion
- Founded: 1243
- Town status: 1925

Government
  - Town Head: Inna Koba

Area
  - Total: 6.52 km^{2} (2.52 sq mi)
- Elevation: 88 m (289 ft)

Population (2023)
  - Total: 6,884
  - Density: 1,060/km^{2} (2,730/sq mi)
- Time zone: UTC+2 (EET)
  - Summer (DST): UTC+3 (EEST)
- Postal code: 39300
- Area code: +380 5344
- Website: Novi Sanzhary

Novi Sanzhary (Ukrainian: Нові Санжари) is a rural settlement, located in Poltava Raion of Poltava Oblast in central Ukraine. It hosts the administration of Novi Sanzhary settlement hromada, one of the hromadas of Ukraine. Population: 7,902 (2022 estimate).

== History ==
Until 18 July 2020, Novi Sanzhary was the administrative center of Novi Sanzhary Raion. The raion was abolished in July 2020 as part of the administrative reform of Ukraine, which reduced the number of raions of Poltava Oblast to four. The area of Novi Sanzhary Raion was merged into Poltava Raion.

On 20 February 2020, the Ukrainian evacuees from China due to the COVID-19 pandemic were taken to Novi Sanzhary. They were met by protesters blocking the buses, throwing stones and engaging in violent clashes with the police. 9 policemen and one civilian were injured. Later, Minister of Healthcare of Ukraine Zoriana Skaletska promised to join those in quarantine for 14 days.

Until 26 January 2024, Novi Sanzhary was designated urban-type settlement. On this day, a new law entered into force which abolished this status, and Novi Sanzhary became a rural settlement.
