= Chutove Raion =

Former subdivision of Poltava Oblast, Ukraine

Chutove Raion Чутівський район
- Raion
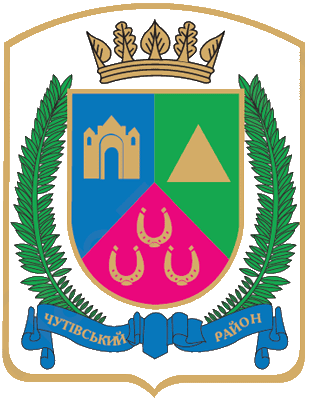
- Flag Coat of arms

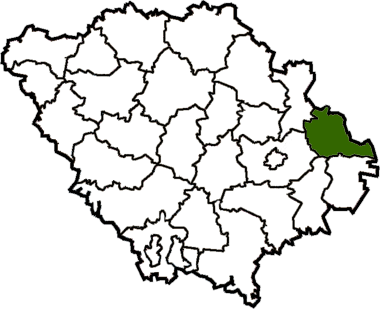
- Coordinates: 49°43′12.9″N 35°5′54.855″E
- Country: Ukraine
- Oblast: Poltava Oblast
- Established: 7 March 1923
- Disestablished: 18 July 2020
- Admin. center: Chutove
- Subdivisions: List: — city councils; — settlement councils; — rural councils; Number of localities: — cities; — urban-type settlements; 50 — villages; — rural settlements

Government
  - Governor: Oleksandr Kvitchatyi

Area
  - Total: 861 km^{2} (332 sq mi)

Population (2020)
  - Total: 22,082
  - Density: 25.6/km^{2} (66.4/sq mi)
- Time zone: UTC+02:00 (EET)
  - Summer (DST): UTC+03:00 (EEST)
- Area code: +380
- Website: Official homepage

Chutove Raion (Ukrainian: Чутівський район, romanized: Čutivs'kyj rajon) was a raion (district) in Poltava Oblast in central Ukraine. The raion's administrative center was the urban-type settlement of Chutove. The raion was abolished on 18 July 2020 as part of the administrative reform of Ukraine, which reduced the number of raions of Poltava Oblast to four. The area of Chutove Raion was merged into Poltava Raion. The last estimate of the raion population was 22,082 (2020 est.)

Important rivers within the raion included the Kolomak and the Orchyk.

At the time of disestablishment, the raion consisted of two hromadas:

- Chutove settlement hromada with the administration in Chutove;
- Skorokhodove settlement hromada with the administration in the urban-type settlement of Skorokhodove.

== Settlements ==
- Skorokhodove
- Chutove
