= Nikolay Shcherbina =

19th-century Russian poet

Nikolay Fyodorovich Shcherbina
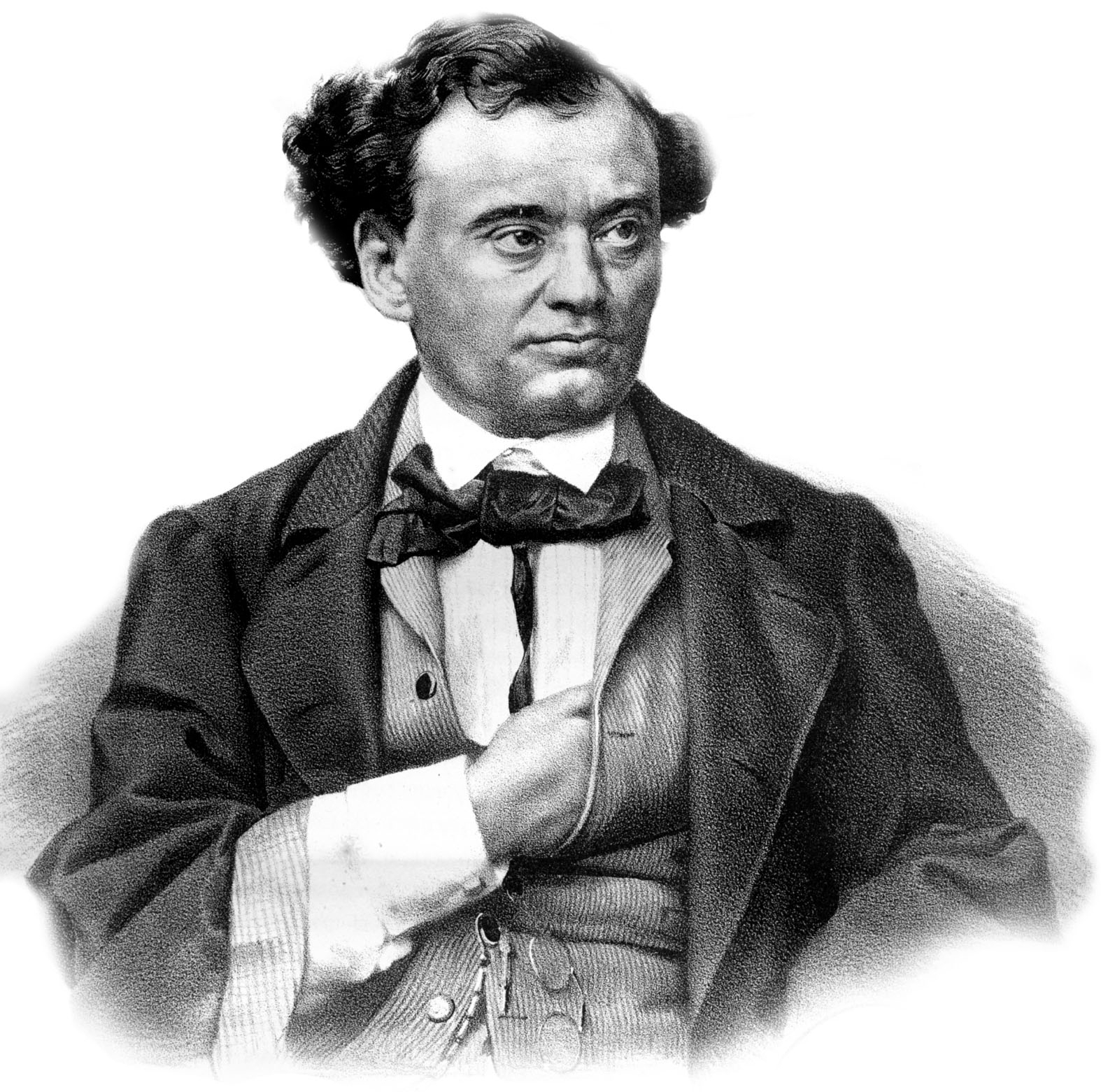
- Born: 14 December [O.S. 2 December] 1821; Taganrog, Russian Empire
- Died: 22 April 1869 (aged 47); Saint Petersburg, Russian Empire

Nikolay Fyodorovich Shcherbina (Russian: Никола́й Фёдорович Щерби́на; 14 December [O.S. 2 December] 1821 – 22 April [O.S. 10 April] 1869) was a 19th-century Russian poet.

== Life ==
Much of the biographical information about Shcherbina comes from autobiographical sources. He was born in the Mius district of the Don Cossack Host in the mansion of his mother. His father was of Cossack descent, and his mother of Greek descent. Both his parents were born into noble families. When he was eight, his family moved to the city of Taganrog, populated by Greek and Italian colonists. This influenced his aesthetic feelings and acquainted him with the Greek way of life and popular legends. Shcherbina studied at the Taganrog Boys Gymnasium (Chekhov Gymnasium), where he fell in love with Greek language lessons and wrote the long poem Sappho at the age of thirteen (which he subsequently destroyed). At the age of twenty he began to study in the Kharkiv University, but could not afford to study there for longer than half a year. He began to work as a teacher to support his parents. In Kharkiv, he met the young writer Osip Rabinovich, who would later become his great friend; Rabinovich would assist him in publishing his poetry, and upon the occasion of Shcherbina's death would call him one of his "best friends" and describe the two of them as "inseparable".

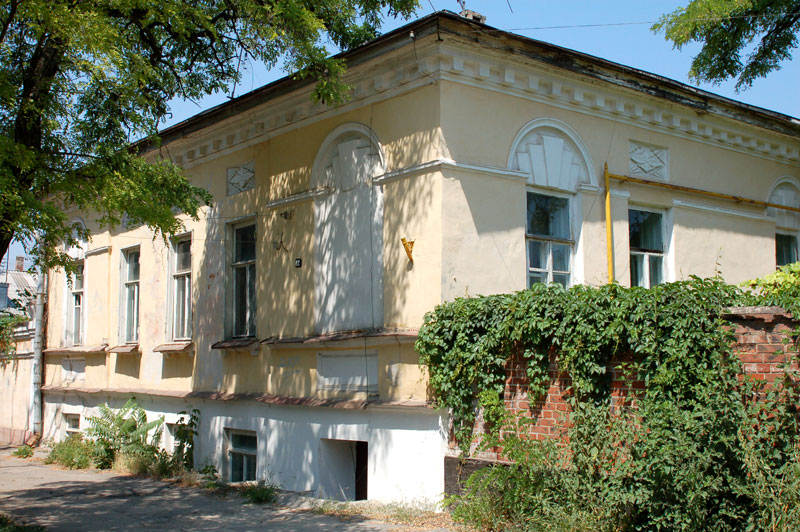
House of Nikolay Shcherbina in Taganrog.

In 1838, his work To the Sea was published for the first time in the magazine Syn Otechestva (Son of the Fatherland). In 1849, he moved to Odessa, where he was able to live with Lev Pushkin, brother of Alexander Pushkin. In 1850, a collection of his poems, Grecheskie stikhotvoreniya (Greek Verses), was published in Odessa and was well received by the public. Shcherbina moved to Moscow the same year, where he worked as assistant to the chief editor of Moskovskie Vedomosti and published poems in various journals from Moscow and Saint Petersburg. In March 1855, he moved to Saint Petersburg, where he was appointed Official for Special Missions at the Ministry of Public Education. In the capital, he published Pchela (Bee), a collection of verses for popular reading, which was approved by the Ministry and improved his financial means. In 1857, his complete works in two volumes and Collection of the Best Russian Poems were published. In 1860–1869, he served at the Ministry of Internal Affairs.

In 1864, he grew ill with a sickness of a throat; this illness caused his death in 1869.
