= Popivka, Okhtyrka Raion, Sumy Oblast =

Popivka Попівка
- Village
- Location within Sumy Oblast Location within Ukraine
- Coordinates: 50°29′51″N 35°27′16″E
- Country: Ukraine
- Oblast: Sumy Oblast
- Raion: Okhtyrka Raion

Population
  - Total: 0
- Time zone: UTC+2 (EET)
  - Summer (DST): UTC+3 (EEST)
- Postal Code: 42822

Popivka (Ukrainian: Попівка), is a village in northeastern Ukraine, located in Okhtyrka Raion of Sumy Oblast. The village is on the banks of the Vorsklytsia River, and is located on the Russian-Ukrainian Border.

== History ==
The exact date of the founding of the village was never known, but is estimated to be around late 18th century.

In 1917, the village was captured by the Soviet army during the Russian Civil War, becoming part of the Soviet Union. During the Holodomor in 1932–1933, almost 300 residents in the village died as a result of mass starvation. During the German-Soviet War, the village was occupied by Wehrmacht forces from October 1941 to August 1943, when it was liberated by Soviet forces during the Soviet counteroffensive in northeastern Ukraine.

In April 2022, even after the Russians' retreat from northern Ukraine, the Russian military fired shells into the village's vicinity.

== Languages spoken ==
- Ukrainian: 95.01%
- Russian: 4.62%
- Others: 0.18%
