= Osip Rabinovich =

Russian-Jewish writer (1817–1869)

Osip Aronovich Rabinovich
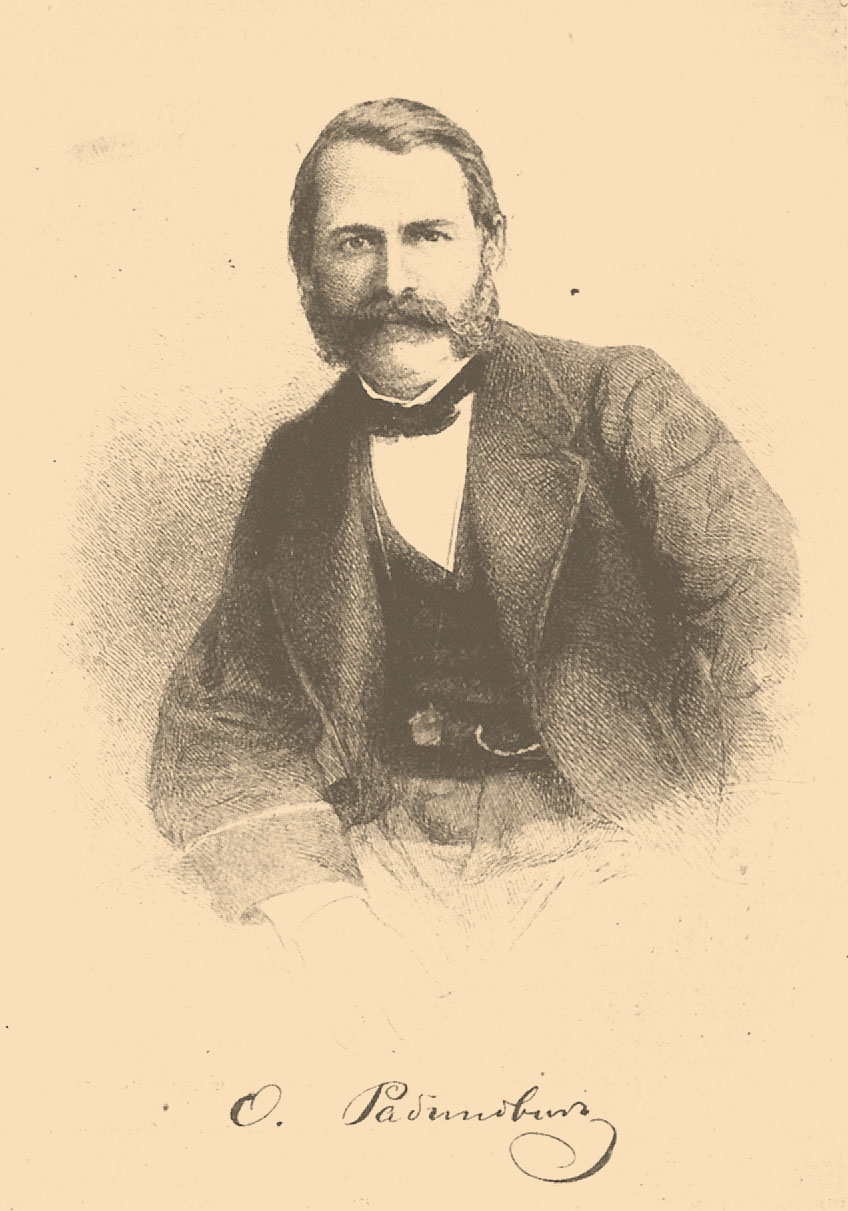
- Portrait of Rabinovich, date and artist unknown
- Born: 26 January 1817 Kobeliaky, Poltava Governorate, Russian Empire
- Died: 28 October 1869 (aged 52) Merano, Tyrol, Austria-Hungary

Osip Aronovich Rabinovich (Russian: О́сип Аро́нович Рабино́вич; 26 January [O.S. 14 January] 1817 – 28 October [O.S. 16 October] 1869) was a Russian-Jewish writer, journal, and belletrist. He is notable as the founder of the first Jewish journal published in Russian.

== Life ==
Rabinovich was born in Kobeliaky on 26 January [O.S. 14 January] 1817 to a well-off family. His father gave him an education in not only Hebrew and in European languages, history, mathematics, art, and music. He was married at age 18. In 1840, he went to study in Kharkov. Rabinovich desired to study law, but the laws of the time banned Jews from studying law; instead, he studied medicine. In Kharkov, he met the poet Nikolay Shcherbina; they would later go on to become good friends, with Rabinovich helping Shcherbina to publish his poetry, and one of the characters in his novel Kaleidoscope being inspired by Shcherbina. Rabinovich could not complete his studies in Kharkov, as he needed to financially support his father. In 1845 he moved to Odessa and began to work as a notary.

He published his first literary work in 1847, a translation of Jacob Eichenbaum's work Ha-Kerav into Russian. He published a novel, Moritz Sefardi, in 1850; and wrote short stories as well. He was compared in style to Dmitry Grigorovich. He drew controversy from the Jewish community for his articles criticizing Jewish society; however, he also wrote articles criticizing Russian antisemitism.

He was the founder and co-editor (alongside Joachim Hayyim Tarnopol) of the first Jewish journal in Russian, Rassvet (Russian: Рассвет, lit. 'The Dawn'). The journal began publication in 1860, with contributors such as Lev Levanda and Isaac Markus Jost. However, it faced struggles due to strict government censorship, and lasted only 1 year, as they were made to cease publication by the government. The journal was passed to others, where it was published under the name Sion and published for another year. Here Rabinovich's literary activity ended. In his later years, he suffered from poor health, and went to Merano in Tyrol to convalesce. There he died of tuberculosis on 28 October [O.S. 16 October] 1869.

As a writer, he was completely forgotten.

== Bibliography ==
- "RABINOVICH (RABBINOWITZ), OSIP AARONOVICH". Jewish Encyclopedia. Funk & Wagnalls. 1906.
- Safran, Gabriella (2007). "Rabinovich, Osip Aronovich". YIVO Encyclopedia. Yale University Press.
- Ignat'yev, N.D. (1910). "Рабинович, Осип Аронович" [Rabinovich, Osip Aronovich]. Russian Biographical Dictionary (in Russian). Vol. 15. Russian Historian Society.
- Izrailson, Yakov Izrailevich (1898). "Рабинович, Осип Ааронович" [Rabinovich, Osip Aaronovich]. Brockhaus and Efron Encyclopedic Dictionary (in Russian). Vol. 25a.
- "Рабинович, Осип Аронович" [Rabinovich, Osip Aronovich]. Granat Encyclopedic Dictionary (in Russian). Vol. 29. 1934.
