= Kobelyaksky Uyezd =

Kobelyaksky Uyezd Кобеляки уѣздъ
- Uezd
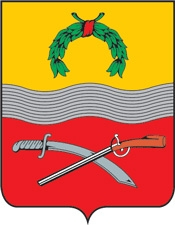
- Coat of arms

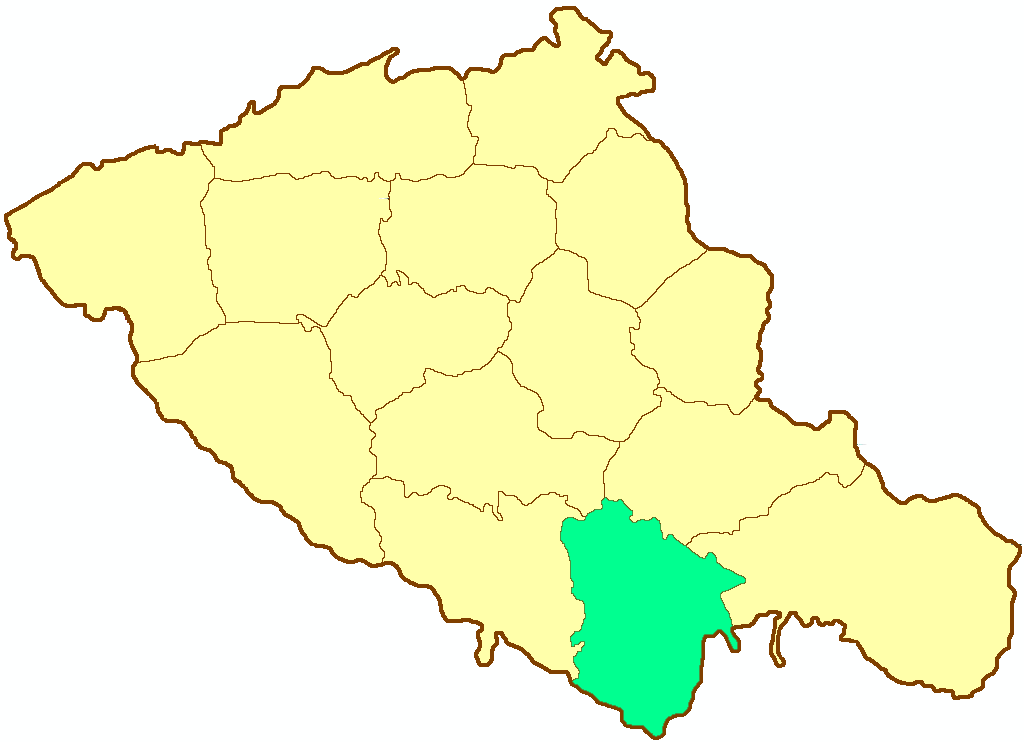
- Location in the Poltava Governorate
- Country: Russian Empire
- Governorate: Poltava
- Established: 1781
- Abolished: 1923
- Capital: Kobelyaki

Population (1897)
  - Total: 227,795

Kobelyaksky Uyezd (Кобелякский уезд) was one of the subdivisions of the Poltava Governorate of the Russian Empire. It was situated in the southern part of the governorate. Its administrative centre was Kobelyaki (Kobeliaky).

== Demographics ==
At the time of the Russian Empire Census of 1897, Kobelyaksky Uyezd had a population of 227,795. Of these, 97.3% spoke Ukrainian, 1.6% Yiddish, 1.0% Russian and 0.1% Polish as their native language.
