= Alexander Davydov (singer) =

Russian opera singer

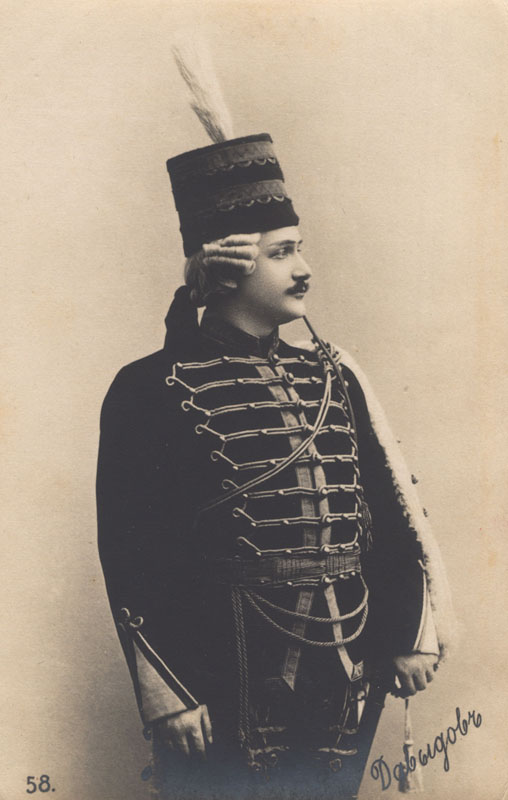
- Born: March 25, 1872; Poltava, Russian Empire
- Died: June 28, 1944 (aged 72); Moscow, USSR
- Occupations: opera singer, memoirist
- Years active: 1890 – 1944
- Spouse: Sofja Osipovna Davydova (1874-1958)

Alexander Mikhaylovich Davydov (Russian: Александр Михайлович Давыдов), real name Israil Moiseyevich Levenson (Russian: Израиль Моисеевич Левенсон; March 25, 1872 – June 28, 1944), was a Russian and Soviet opera and operetta singer, later a theatre director, pedagogue and memoirist. In 1924 he was designated a Meritorious Artist of the Republic.

== Biography ==
Israil Levenson was born in the town of Kobeliaky, Poltava Governorate, to the family of a Jewish teacher. Aged twelve he made a journey to Kiev where he started to perform, singing in cafes and restaurants. One of the musicians he made friends with, Ippolit Pryanishnikov helped the young man to join the Kiev opera choir.

After studying for two years under Camille Everardi, in 1892 Alexander Davydov made his debut at the Tiflis opera. Then he developed a passion to operetta and started travelling from one city to another, performing in local theatres. In 1900 he joined the Saint Petersburg's Mariinsky Theatre and made his debut there as Hermann in The Queen of Spades to huge critical and popular acclaim.

Davydov, the most popular male Russian singer of his generation, made about 400 gramophone recordings in 1901-1912. His huge repertoire included 85 operas and 30 operettas. In 1909 Sergey Dyagilev invited now famous Davydov to take part in his Russian Seasons in Paris.

In 1914 due to progressing deafness Davydov was forced to quit opera but continued to perform, singing popular songs and romances. In 1924 he departed to France and was invited by Fyodor Chalyapin to become the artistic director of his opera troupe. In 1935 Davydov returned to the USSR. In his later years he taught vocals at Mariinsky Theatre (known at the time as the Kirov Opera and Ballet Theatre) and published memoirs on Tchaikovsky and Chalyapin, among many other musicians and composers he'd met.

Alexander Davydov died in Moscow on June 28, 1944.
