= Skorokhodove =

Rural locality in Poltava Oblast, Ukraine

Skorokhodove Скороходове
- Rural settlement
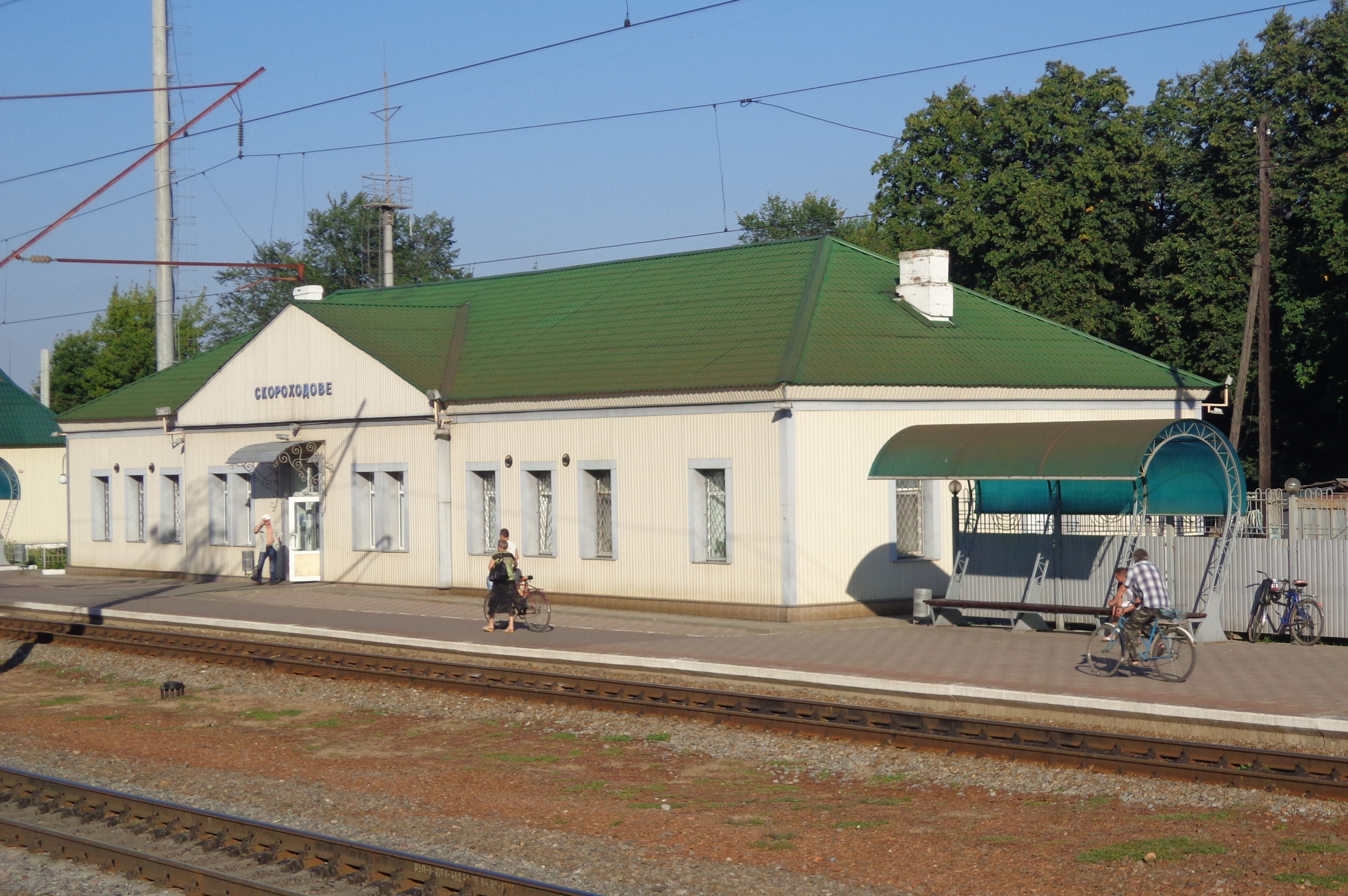

- Flag

- Location within Poltava Oblast Location within Ukraine
- Coordinates: 49.76°N 35.06°E
- Country: Ukraine
- Oblast: Poltava Oblast
- Raion: Poltava Raion
- Founded: 1938

Population (2022)
  - Total: 3,193
- Time zone: UTC+2 (EET)
  - Summer (DST): UTC+3 (EEST)
- Postal code: 38813
- Area code: +380 5347

Skorokhodove (Ukrainian: Скороходове) is a rural settlement in Poltava Raion (district) of Poltava Oblast in central Ukraine. It hosts the administration of Skorokhodove settlement hromada, one of the hromadas of Ukraine. Population: 3,193 (2022 estimate).

It is located 10 km away from the Kyiv-Kharkiv highway. Also in the settlement there is Skorokhodove railway station.

== History ==
It was founded in 1938, around Artem sugar factory. Another source has the establishment date around 1903-1905. Until 2016 the settlement was known as Artemivka. On 17 May 2016, Verkhovna Rada adopted decision to rename Artemivka to Skorokhodove according to the law prohibiting names of Communist origin.

Town was occupied on October 4, 1941, by the German army. It was liberated on September 3, 1943.

Until 18 July 2020, Skorokhodove belonged to Chutove Raion. The raion was abolished in July 2020 as part of the administrative reform of Ukraine, which reduced the number of raions of Poltava Oblast to four. The area of Chutove Raion was merged into Poltava Raion.

Until 26 January 2024, Skorokhodove was designated urban-type settlement. On this day, a new law entered into force which abolished this status, and Skorokhodove became a rural settlement.

Old Postal code used to be 315061, now it is 38831.

== Demographics ==
Historical population
Year	Pop.	±%
1959	5,700	—
1969	6,900	+21.1%
1989	4,300	−37.7%
2001	3,628	−15.6%
2007	3,111	−14.3%

Annual growth is -1.51%. 2007 Population is estimated.

== Government ==
City council building is located at Artema 15, Skorohodove, Chutovo distr., Poltava reg., 38813, Ukraine. City council consists of 25 members.

Head of city council since March 26, 2006 - Drozd Vasil Michailovich (ДРОЗД Василь Михайлович). Born in 1950.

=== Elections ===
2004 Presidential Elections October 31, 2004

Presidential Candidate	Vote Total	%
Viktor Yushchenko	380	35.71
Viktor Yanukovych (W)	463	43.51
Petro Symonenko	69	6.48
Oleksandr Moroz	53	4.98
Nataliya Vitrenko	22	2.06
Oleksandr Yakovenko	7	0.65
Anatoliy Kinakh	6	0.56
Mikhaylo Brodskiy	2	0.18
О. Baziluk	1	0.09
Yuriy Zbitnev	1	0.09
R. Kozak	1	0.09
D. Korchinskiy	1	0.09
V. Kruvobokov	1	0.09
Volodumur Nechuporuk	1	0.09
O. Omelchinko	1	0.09
Oleksandr Rzhavskiy	1	0.09
A. Chornovil	1	0.09
Total	1,064	
Source: WWW ІАС "Ukrainian Presidential Election"

2nd 2004 Presidential Elections November 21, 2004

Presidential Candidate	Vote Total	%
Viktor Yushchenko	423	39.16
Viktor Yanukovych (W)	615	56.94
Other	42	2.87
Total	1,080	
Source: WWW ІАС "Ukrainian Presidential Election"

2004 Presidential Elections December 26, 2004

Presidential Candidate	Vote Total	%
Viktor Yushchenko	397	39.54
Viktor Yanukovych (W)	562	55.97
Other	45	3.28
Total	1,004	
Source: WWW ІАС "Ukrainian Presidential Election"

== Economy ==
=== Agriculture and Food Processing ===
Sugar factory "Artem".

Skorohodovskiy Dairy Factory, Open Joint-Stock Company
Director - M. Petrinenko
Pervomaiska St.1, vil. Skorohodove, Chutivskyi distr., Poltava reg., 38813, Ukraine

- dairy products
- casein
- butter

Bread Warehouse N88, State Enterprise
Skorohodove, Chutovo distr., Poltava reg., 38813, Ukraine
Opened in 1954.
Number of employees (total in the company) 101 - 250

ZORIA Agri-Enterprise
Skorohodove, Chutovo distr., Poltava reg., 38813, Ukraine
Opened in 1992.
Number of employees (total in the company) 1 - 10

=== Industrial organizations ===
Artemivka Motor Transport Repair Plant, PubJSC
Director - M. Petrinenko
Myru St.2, vil. Skorohodove, Chutovo distr., Poltava reg., 38813, Ukraine
Opened in 1994.
Number of employees (total in the company) 51 - 100

== Education ==
School
On June 2, 2004, teachers underwent short training on how to use a computer. чіна.

School of Working Youth
Theatre
