= Kobeliaky =

City in Poltava Oblast, Ukraine

Kobeliaky Кобеляки
- City
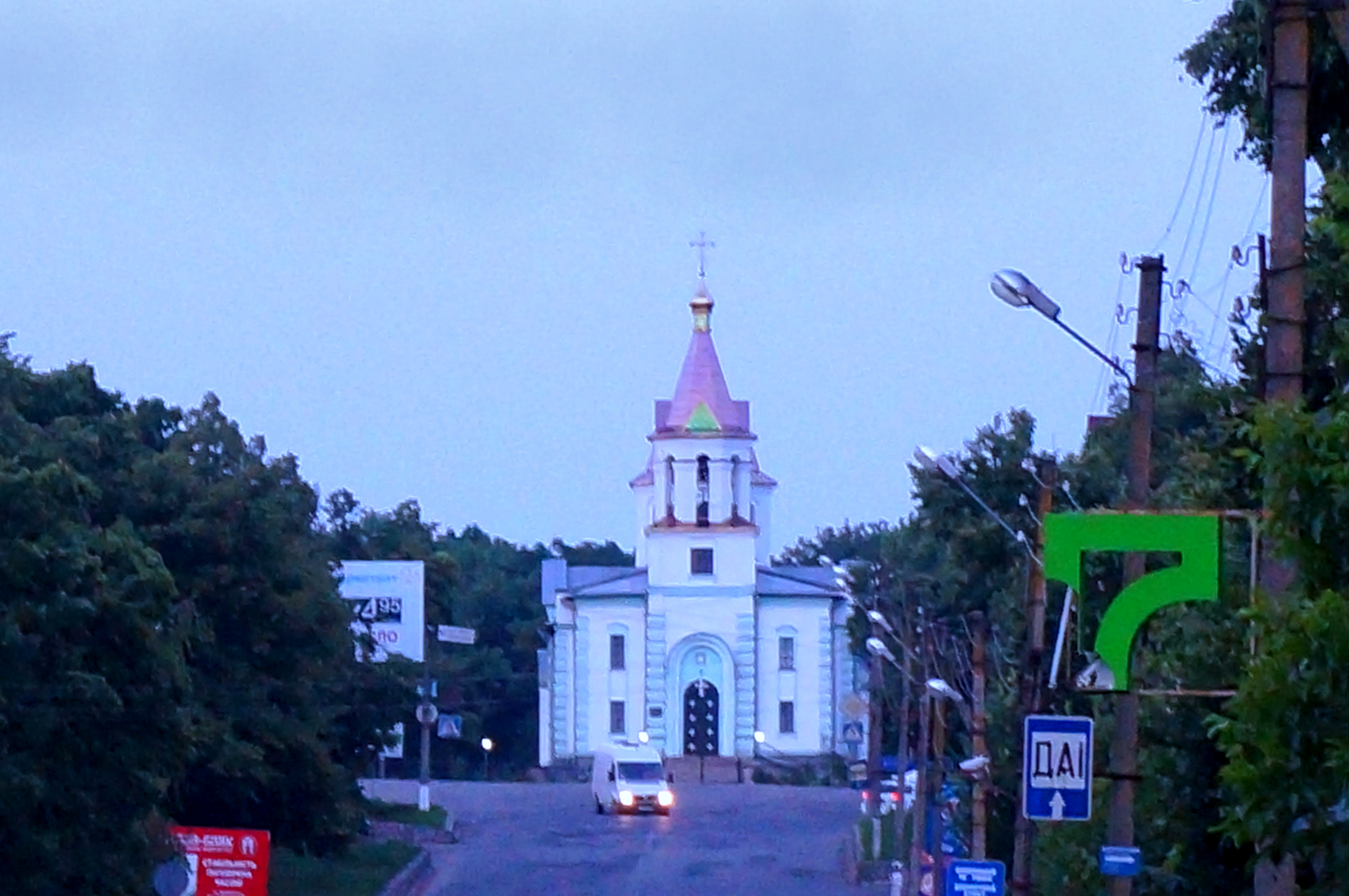
- Church in Kobeliaky

- Flag Coat of arms
- Interactive map of Kobeliaky
- Location of Kobeliaky Kobeliaky (Poltava Oblast)
- Coordinates: 49°08′00″N 34°12′00″E
- Country: Ukraine
- Oblast: Poltava Oblast
- Raion: Poltava Raion
- Hromada: Kobeliaky urban hromada
- Founded: 1620

Area
  - Total: 1.21 km^{2} (0.47 sq mi)
- Elevation: 80 m (260 ft)

Population (2022)
  - Total: 9,465
  - Density: 7,820/km^{2} (20,300/sq mi)
- Time zone: UTC+2 (EET)
  - Summer (DST): UTC+3 (EEST)
- Postal code: 39200—39204
- Vehicle registration: BI

Kobeliaky (Ukrainian: Кобеляки, pronounced [kobeˈlʲɑkɪ]) is a city in Poltava Raion, Poltava Oblast, Ukraine. It hosts the administration of Kobeliaky urban hromada, one of the hromadas of Ukraine. Population: 9,465 (2022 estimate).

== History ==
After 1649, Kobeliaky was a sotnia town of Poltava Regiment in the Cossack Hetmanate. Until the Revolution of 1917 it served as the centre of a district.

In 1939 the population of Kobeliaky exceeded 10,000 inhabitants. During World War II, the city was under German occupation from 15 September 1941 until 25 September 1943.

Until 18 July 2020, Kobeliaky was the administrative center of Kobeliaky Raion. The raion was abolished in July 2020 as part of the administrative reform of Ukraine, which reduced the number of raions of Poltava Oblast to four. The area of Kobeliaky Raion was merged into Poltava Raion.

== Population ==
=== Ethnic groups ===
Distribution of the population by ethnicity according to the 2001 census:

Ethnic groups in Kobeliaky
	percent
Ukrainians	94.57%
Russians	4.37%
Armenians	0.41%
Belarusians	0.21%
Azerbaijanis	0.12%
others	0.32%

=== Language ===
Distribution of the population by native language according to the 2001 census:

Language	Percentage
Ukrainian	95.66%
Russian	3.84%
other/undecided	0.5%

== Economy ==
Kobeliaky is a centre of food industry.

== Geography ==
Kobeliaky is located in the Dnieper Lowland. The town sits on the right-hand side of the Vorskla river, two-thirds of its path from Poltava to Dnieper.

=== Climate ===
Climate data for Kobeliaky (1981–2010)
Month	Jan	Feb	Mar	Apr	May	Jun	Jul	Aug	Sep	Oct	Nov	Dec	Year
Mean daily maximum °C (°F)	−1.0 (30.2)	−0.1 (31.8)	5.9 (42.6)	15.1 (59.2)	21.9 (71.4)	25.3 (77.5)	27.6 (81.7)	27.0 (80.6)	20.9 (69.6)	13.4 (56.1)	4.8 (40.6)	0.1 (32.2)	13.4 (56.1)
Daily mean °C (°F)	−3.8 (25.2)	−3.5 (25.7)	1.7 (35.1)	9.6 (49.3)	15.9 (60.6)	19.5 (67.1)	21.5 (70.7)	20.7 (69.3)	15.0 (59.0)	8.6 (47.5)	1.7 (35.1)	−2.5 (27.5)	8.7 (47.7)
Mean daily minimum °C (°F)	−6.5 (20.3)	−6.5 (20.3)	−1.8 (28.8)	4.9 (40.8)	10.3 (50.5)	14.1 (57.4)	16.0 (60.8)	15.0 (59.0)	10.0 (50.0)	4.6 (40.3)	−0.9 (30.4)	−5.1 (22.8)	4.5 (40.1)
Average precipitation mm (inches)	40.1 (1.58)	34.3 (1.35)	35.4 (1.39)	35.8 (1.41)	48.5 (1.91)	57.3 (2.26)	57.0 (2.24)	41.2 (1.62)	52.2 (2.06)	39.4 (1.55)	41.3 (1.63)	39.0 (1.54)	521.5 (20.53)
Average precipitation days (≥ 1.0 mm)	8.1	7.1	7.5	6.1	6.9	7.9	6.7	5.3	6.0	5.8	7.0	7.6	82.0
Average relative humidity (%)	84.7	81.3	75.9	65.4	61.9	66.4	65.8	62.9	69.8	76.3	84.5	85.7	73.4
Source: World Meteorological Organization

== Notable people ==
- Nikolai Timofeyevich Gres (1920–2003), soloist with the Bolshoi Theatre and the Alexandrov Ensemble
- Alexander Davydov (1872–1944), opera singer
- Alexey Ivakhnenko (1913–2007), academician, mathematician
- Hryhory Kytasty (1907–1984), composer, conductor
- Georgy Prokopenko (1937–2021), swimmer
- Osip Rabinovich (1817–1869), writer
- Stepan Shkurat (1886–1973), actor
- Myroslav Kuvaldin (born 1975), singer and founder of the band The VYO (born in Kamianske)
- Serhiy Pidkaura (born 1974), musician, founder and guitarist of the band The VYO

== Gallery ==
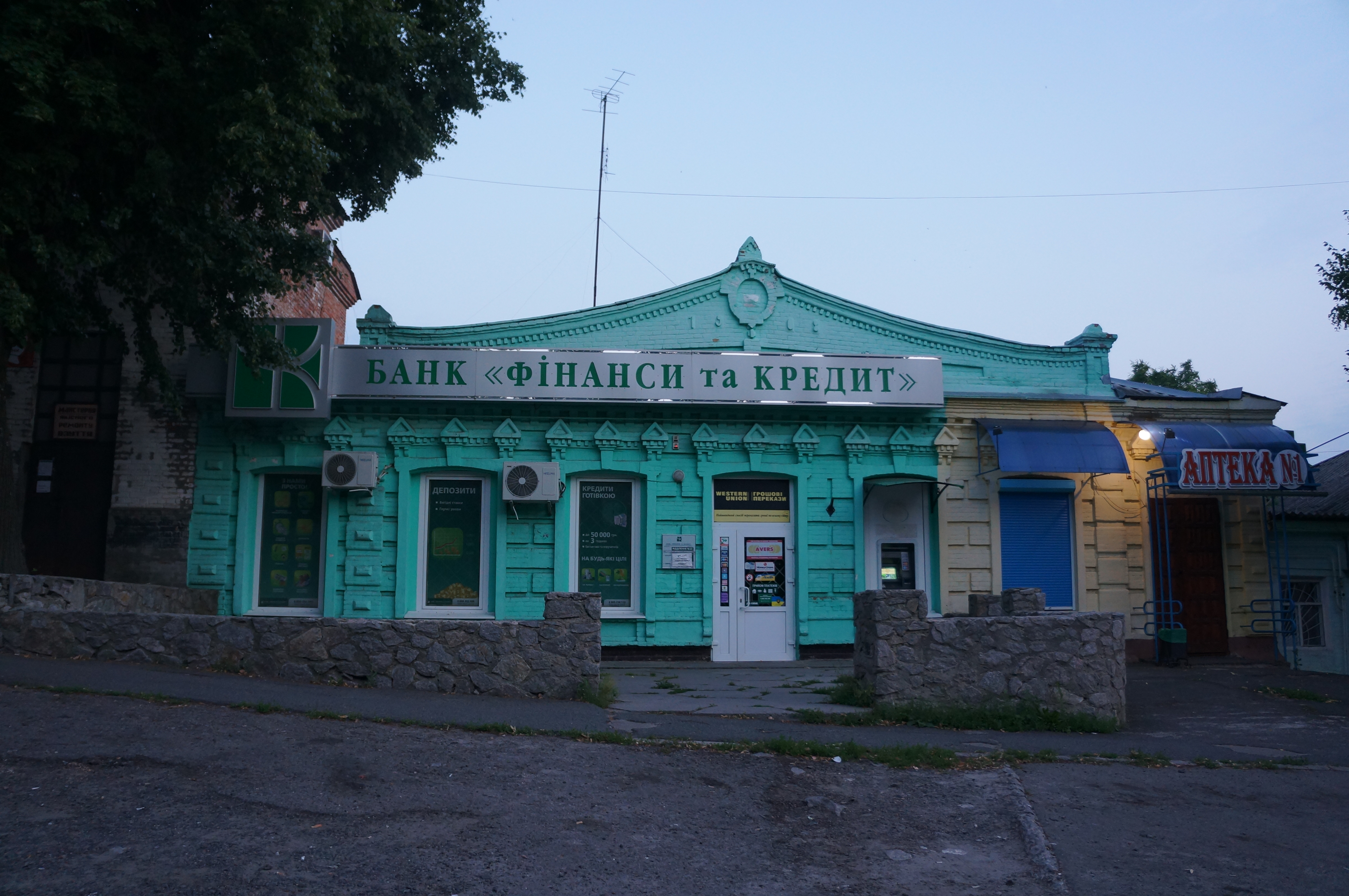
Historical building in Kobeliaky

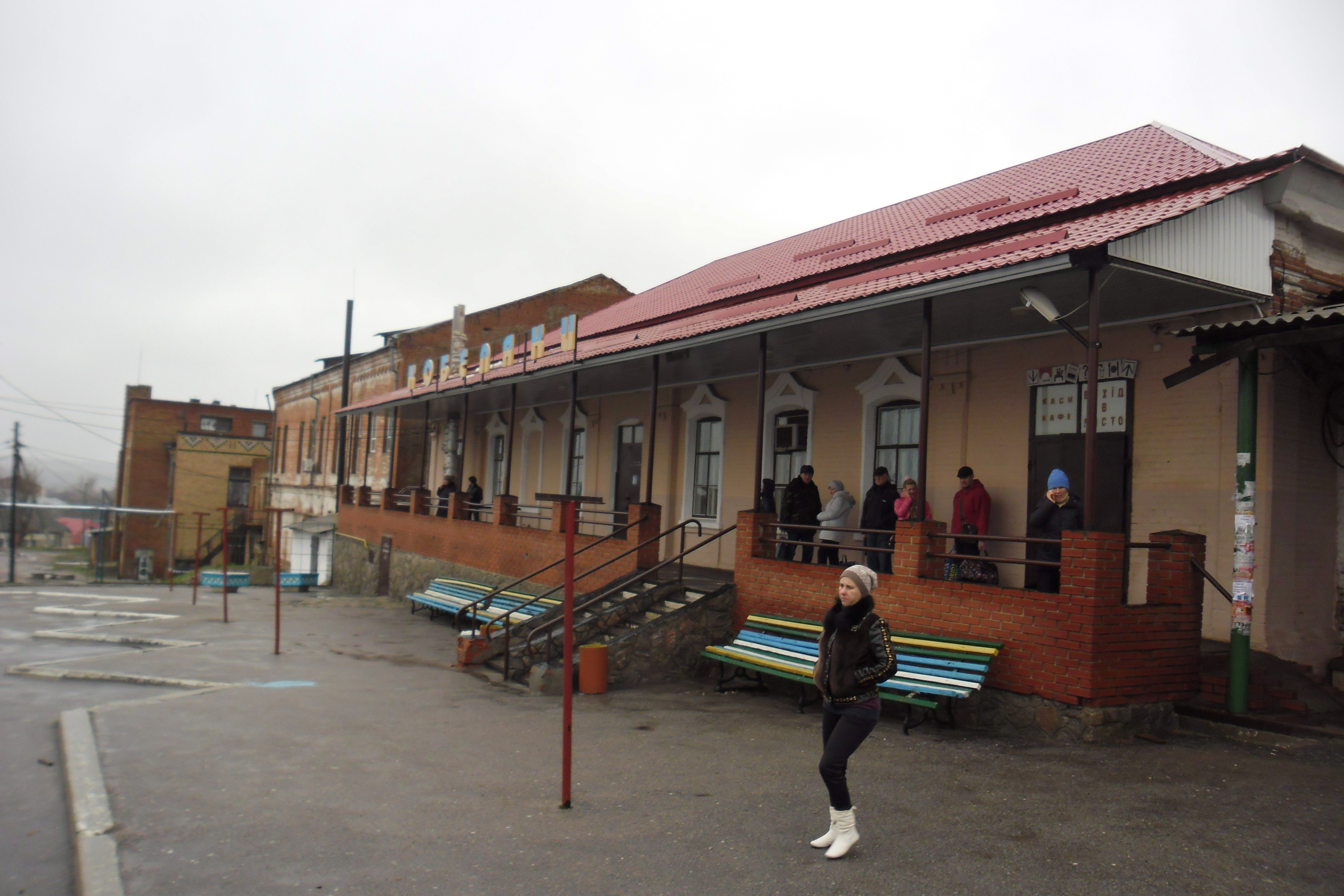
Bus station

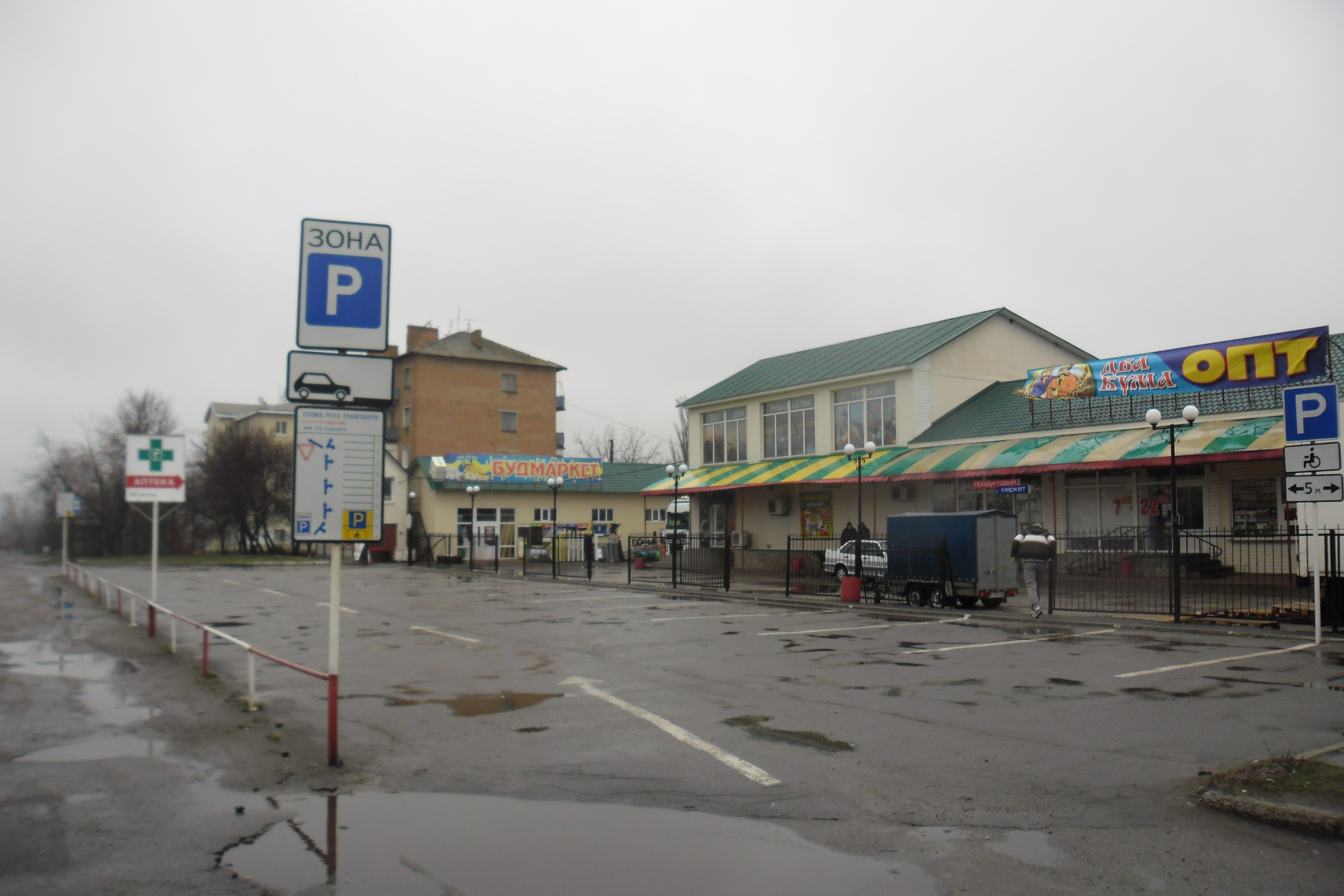
Shops in Kobeliaky

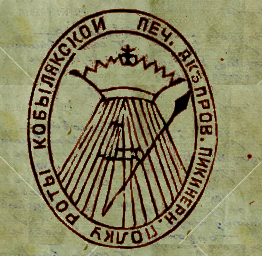
Seal of Kobeliaky Company of the Dnieper Pikeman Regiment (Russian Empire)

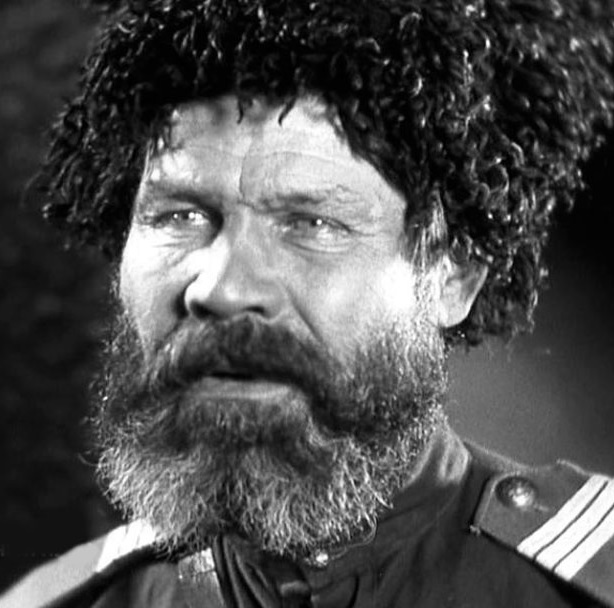
People's Actor of Ukraine Stepan Shkurat (from film "Chapayev", 1934)
