= Vorsklytsia =

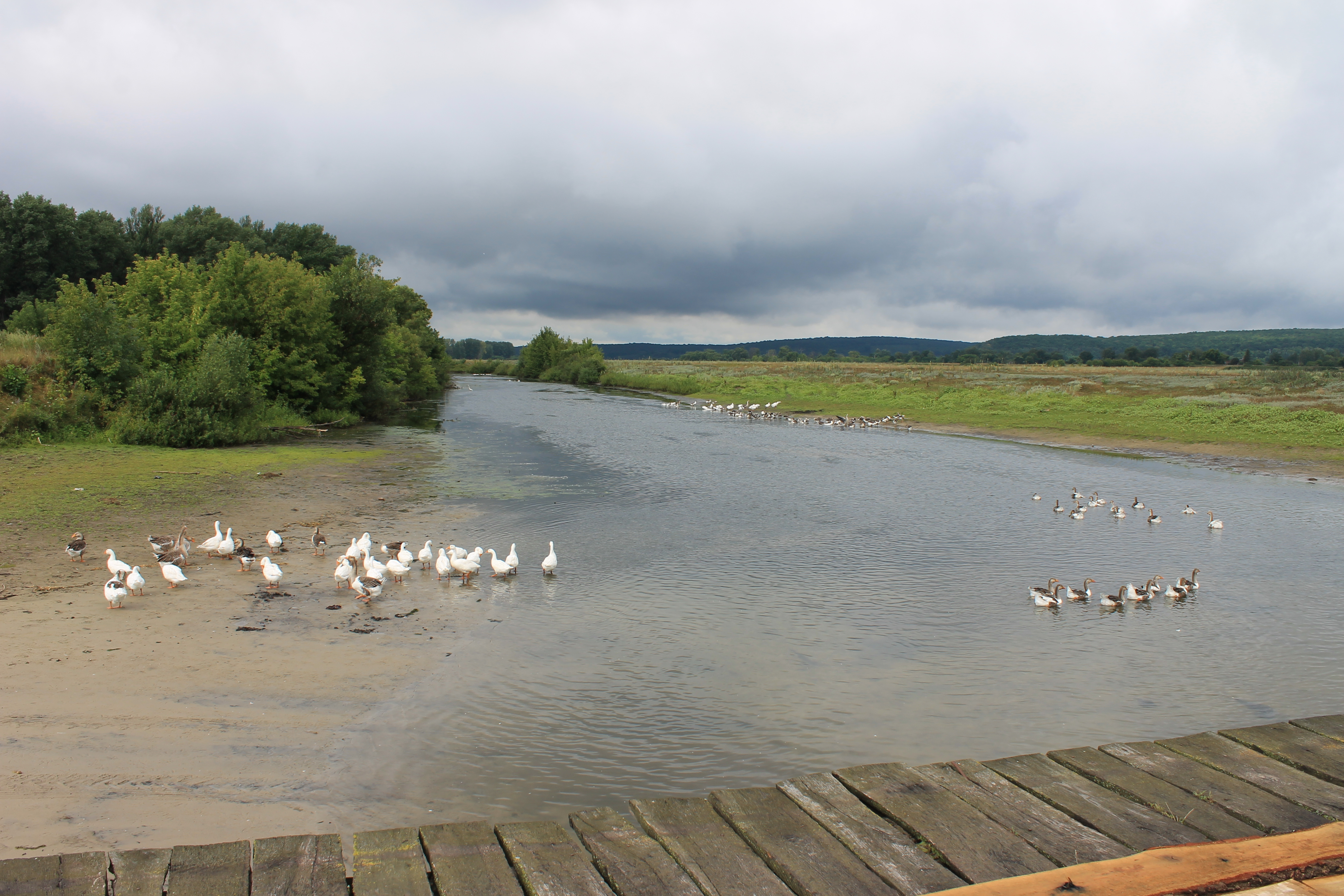
- Native name: Ворсклица (Russian); Ворсклиця (Ukrainian)

Location
- Country: Russia, Ukraine
- Region: Russia: Belgorod Oblast; Ukraine: Sumy Oblast

Physical characteristics
- Source
  - location: Central Russian Upland near Proletarsky, Belgorod Oblast, Russia
  - coordinates: 50°46′26″N 35°46′52″E
- Mouth: Vorskla
  - location: Sumy Oblast, Ukraine
  - coordinates: 50°22′39″N 35°06′54″E
- Length: 101 km (63 mi)
- Basin size: 1,480 km^{2} (570 sq mi)

Basin features
- Progression: Dnieper→ Dnieper–Bug estuary→ Black Sea

The Vorsklytsia or Vorsklitsa (Russian: Ворсклица; Ukrainian: Ворсклиця) is a river in Belgorod Oblast, Russia and Sumy Oblast, Ukraine. It is a right tributary of the Vorskla.

The valley of Vorsklytsia is trapezoidal with a width of 4–5 km (2.5–3.1 mi) and the river runs in great meanders. The floodplains are swampy, especially in the lower reaches, the right bank is often quite steep, the left bank rather low. The gradient of Vorsklytsia is 0.77 m/km. The river freezes in early December and remains frozen until mid-March.
