= Drabynivka rural hromada =

Drabynivka rural hromada Драбинівська сільська громада
- Hromada
- Interactive map of Drabynivka rural hromada
- Country: Ukraine
- Oblast: Poltava Oblast
- Raion: Poltava Raion
- Admin. center: Drabynivka

Area
  - Total: 246.1 km^{2} (95.0 sq mi)

Population (2018)
  - Total: 4,328
  - Density: 17.59/km^{2} (45.55/sq mi)
- CATOTTG code: UA53080070000036333
- Settlements: 16
- Villages: 16
- Website: drabynivska.gromada.org.ua

Drabynivka rural hromada is one of the hromadas of Poltava Raion in Poltava Oblast of Ukraine. Its administrative centre is the village of Drabynivka.

== Composition ==
The hromada includes 16 villages:

- Bohdanivka
- Dovha Pustosh
- Drabynivka (administrative centre)
- Dudkyn Hai
- Halushchyna Hreblia
- Kruta Balka
- Kustolove
- Luhove
- Mali Solontsi
- Mushyna Hreblia
- Raiduzhne
- Sukha Mayachka
- Varvarivka
- Veselka
- Vovkivka
- Vilnyi Step
