= Poltava Raion =

Subdivision of Poltava Oblast, Ukraine

Poltava Raion Полтавський район
- Raion
- Flag Coat of arms

- Coordinates: 49°35′22″N 34°33′05″E
- Country: Ukraine
- Oblast: Poltava
- Established: March 7, 1923
- Admin. center: Poltava
- Subdivisions: 24 hromadas

Government
  - Governor: Lidia Lepeyko

Area
  - Total: 10,844.2 km^{2} (4,187.0 sq mi)

Population (2022)
  - Total: 582,391
  - Density: 53.7053/km^{2} (139.096/sq mi)
- Time zone: UTC+02:00 (EET)
  - Summer (DST): UTC+03:00 (EEST)
- Postal index: 38701—38786
- Area code: +380-5322
- Website: Official homepage

Poltava Raion (Ukrainian: Полтавський район, romanized: Poltavs'kyi raion) is a raion (district) in Poltava Oblast of central Ukraine. The raion's administrative center is the city of Poltava. Population: 582,391 (2022 estimate).

On 18 July 2020, as part of the administrative reform of Ukraine, the number of raions of Poltava Oblast was reduced to four, and the area of Poltava Raion was significantly expanded. The January 2020 estimate of the raion population was 68,174 (2020 est.).

== Administrative division ==
=== Current ===
After the reform in July 2020, the raion consisted of 24 hromadas:

- Bilyky settlement hromada with the administration in the rural settlement of Bilyky, transferred from Kobeliaky Raion;
- Chutove settlement hromada with the administration in the rural settlement of Chutove, transferred from Chutove Raion;
- Drabynivka rural hromada with the administration in the village of Drabynivka, transferred from Novi Sanzhary Raion
- Dykanka settlement hromada with the administration in the rural settlement of Dykanka, transferred from Dykanka Raion;
- Karlivka urban hromada with the administration in the city of Karlivka, transferred from Karlivka Raion;
- Kobeliaky urban hromada with the administration in the city of Kobeliaky, transferred from Kobeliaky Raion;
- Kolomatske rural hromada with the administration in the selo of Kolomatske, retained from Poltava Raion;
- Kotelva settlement hromada with the administration in the rural settlement of Kotelva, transferred from Kotelva Raion;
- Lanna rural hromada with the administration in the settlement of Lanna, transferred from Karlivka Raion;
- Machukhy rural hromada with the administration in the selo of Machukhy, retained from Poltava Raion;
- Martynivka rural hromada with the administration in the settlement of Martynivka, transferred from Karlivka Raion;
- Mashivka settlement hromada with the administration in the rural settlement of Mashivka, transferred from Mashivka Raion;
- Mykhailivka rural hromada with the administration in the selo of Mykhailivka, transferred from Mashivka Raion;
- Novoselivka rural hromada with the administration in the selo of Novoselivka, retained from Poltava Raion;
- Poltava urban hromada with the administration in the city of Poltava, transferred from city of the oblast significance of Poltava and retained from Poltava Raion;
- Shcherbani rural hromada with the administration in the selo of Shcherbani, retained from Poltava Raion;
- Skorokhodove settlement hromada with the administration in the rural settlement of Skorokhodove, transferred from Chutove Raion;
- Tereshky rural hromada with the administration in the selo of Tereshky, retained from Poltava Raion;
- Velyka Rublivka rural hromada with the administration in the selo of Velyka Rublivka, transferred from Kotelva Raion.

=== Before 2020 ===
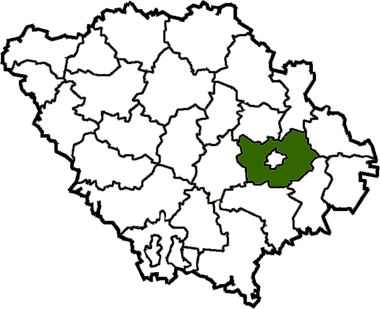
Poltava Raion in Poltava Oblast before 2020

Before the 2020 reform, the raion consisted of five hromadas,

- Kolomatske rural hromada with the administration in Kolomatske, retained from Poltava Raion;
- Machukhy rural hromada with the administration in Machukhy, retained from Poltava Raion;
- Novoselivka rural hromada with the administration in Novoselivka, retained from Poltava Raion;
- Shcherbani rural hromada with the administration in Shcherbani, retained from Poltava Raion;
- Tereshky rural hromada with the administration in Tereshky, retained from Poltava Raion.

== Geography ==
The district is located in the eastern part of Poltava region, on the Dnieper Lowland, on the left bank of the Dnieper Valley. The relief of the district is an undulating plain, cut by river valleys, ravines, and gullies.

The climate of the district is temperate continental. The average temperature in January is −3.7 °C, in July it is +21.4 °C, the amount of precipitation is 480–580 mm/year, which falls mainly in the summer as rain.

The landscapes are represented by forest-steppe. Chernozems dominate the territory of the district.

The Vorskla, Orchyk, and Psel rivers, left tributaries of the Dnieper, flow through the district. The river in the floodplain has many oxbow lakes and artificial lakes.

Poltava Raion has reserves of clay, sapropel, bischofite, natural gas, potassium-magnesium salt. The district is located in the Eastern oil and gas region of Ukraine In the Potava district, the bischofite deposits are the deepest in the world, mined from a depth of 2.5 km.

The regional landscape parks "Dykansky" and "Nyzhnevorsk" are located in the Poltava region.
