= Vorskla =

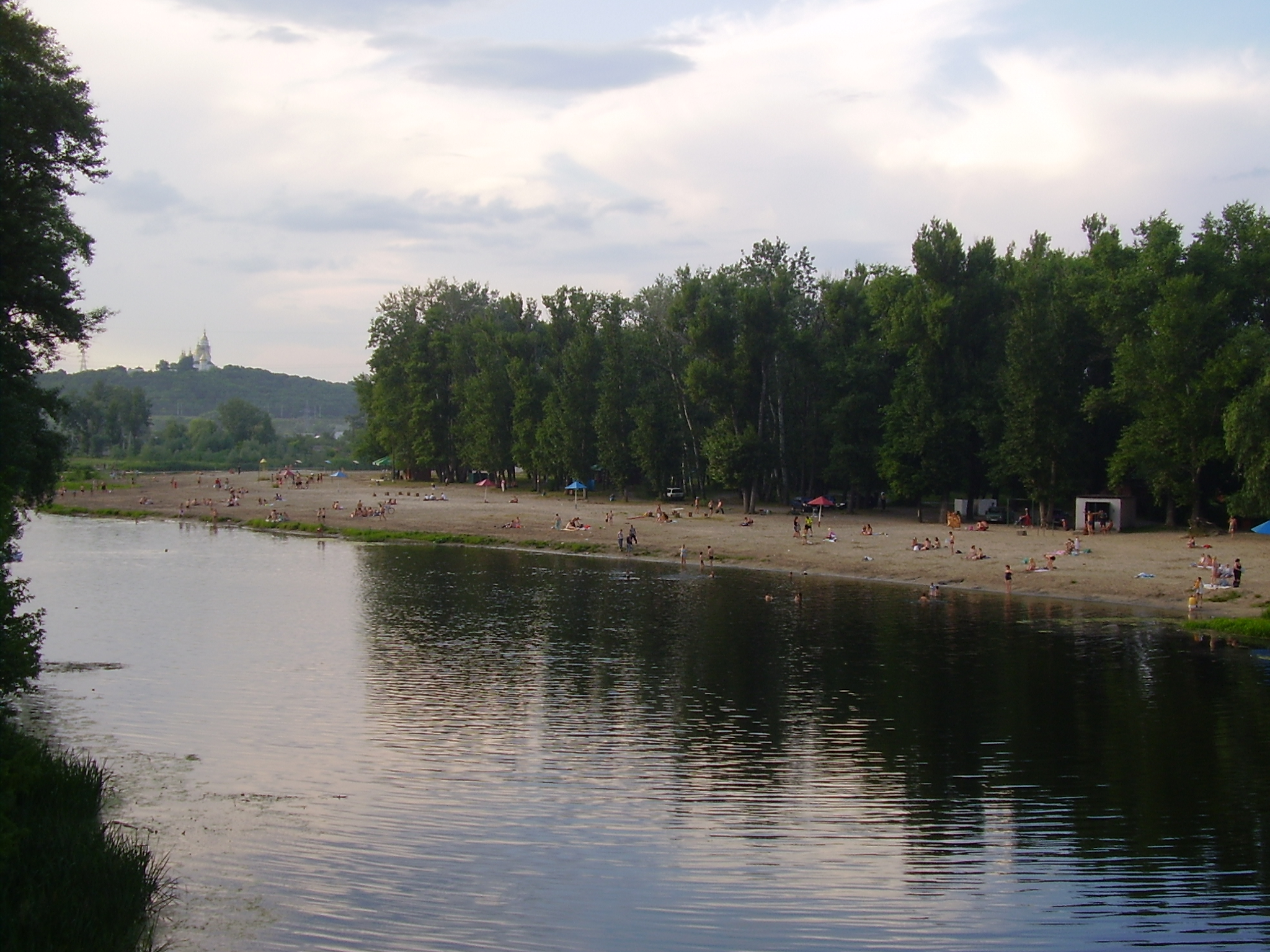
- The Vorskla in Poltava, Ukraine

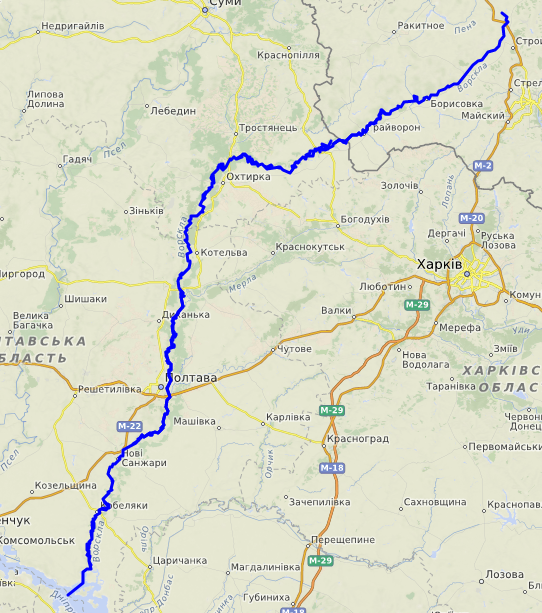
- Native name: Ворскла

Location
- Country: Russia, Ukraine
- Region: Russia: Belgorod Oblast; Ukraine: Sumy Oblast, Poltava Oblast

Physical characteristics
- Source
  - location: Belgorod Oblast, Russia
- Mouth: Dnieper (Kamianske Reservoir)
  - location: Poltava Oblast, Ukraine
  - coordinates: 48°54′15″N 34°07′18″E
- Length: 464 km (288 mi)
- Basin size: 14,700 km^{2} (5,700 sq mi)

Basin features
- Progression: Dnieper→ Dnieper–Bug estuary→ Black Sea

The Vorskla (Russian: Ворскла; Ukrainian: Ворскла) is a river that runs from Belgorod Oblast in Russia southwards into northeastern Ukraine, where it joins the Dnieper.

== Geography ==
The river's source is on the western slopes of the Central Russian Upland north of Belgorod. Within Ukraine it flows through the Dnieper Lowland, passing through Sumy Oblast, and then crossing Poltava Oblast. It has a length of 464 kilometres (288 mi), and a basin area of 14,700 square kilometres (5,700 sq mi). The river is the 15th longest in Ukraine stretching for 348 kilometres (216 mi).

Right tributaries of the river include the Vorsklytsia and Boromlia, and left tributaries Merla, Kolomak and Tahamlyk.

Cities on the river are Grayvoron, Okhtyrka, Poltava (the capital of Poltava Oblast), and Kobeliaky. The river is mostly navigable between its delta and Kobeliaky.

== History ==
An ancient fort, thought to be Gelonos, is on the Vorskla south of Okhtyrka. In 1399, the Battle of the Vorskla River was fought in the area. In 1709, the city of Poltava was besieged by Charles XII.

== Flora and fauna ==
In the river there are more than 50 species of fish, most of which are carps and pikes, breams, rudds, roaches, minnows, catfish.

Fauna is represented by hares, foxes, in the woods you can meet roe deer and wild boar, a great variety of birds: wild duck, gray heron, partridge, pheasant.

Along the banks of the river there are large wooded areas, as coniferous (mostly on the left bank) and deciduous forests.

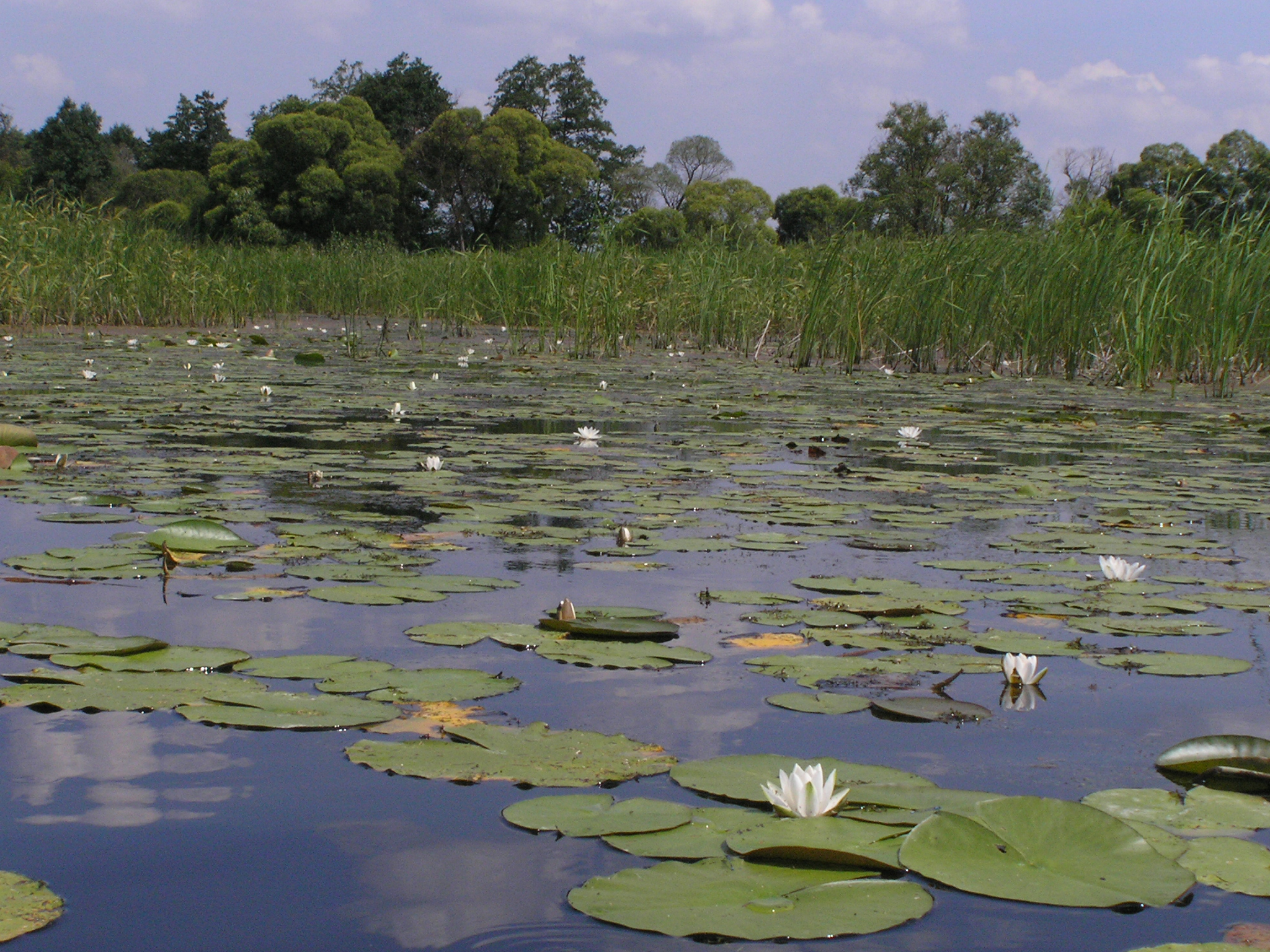
White lilies of the Vorskla River in July 2005

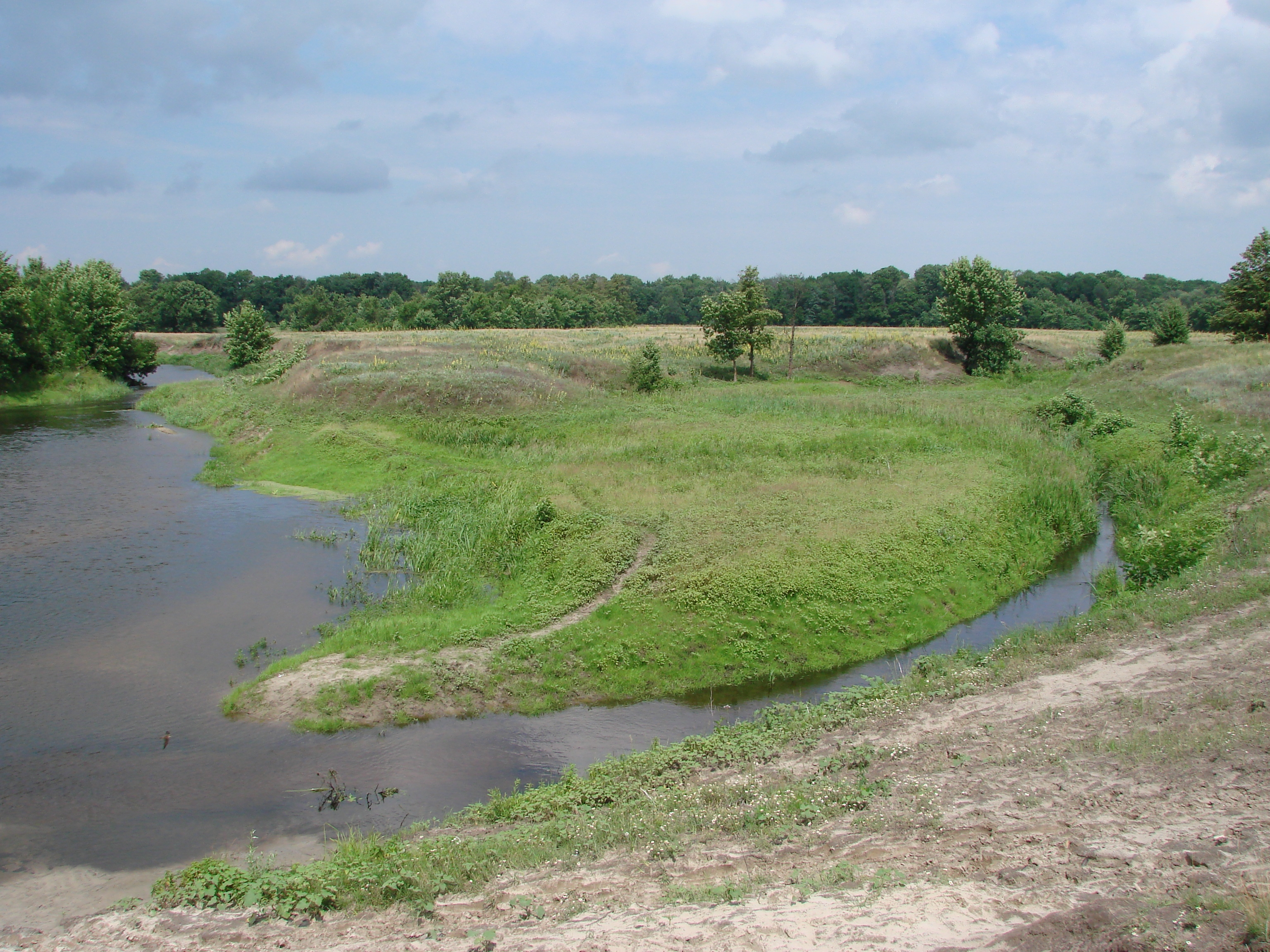
Vorskla River near Khukhra village

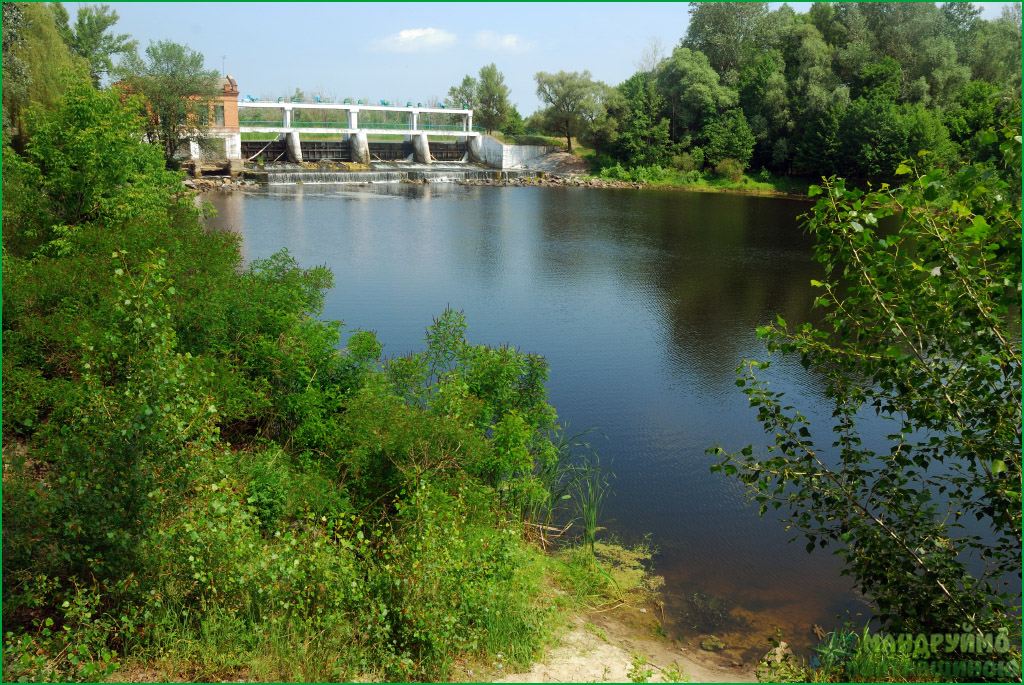
Vorska River near Opishnya with a small hydro-electric station

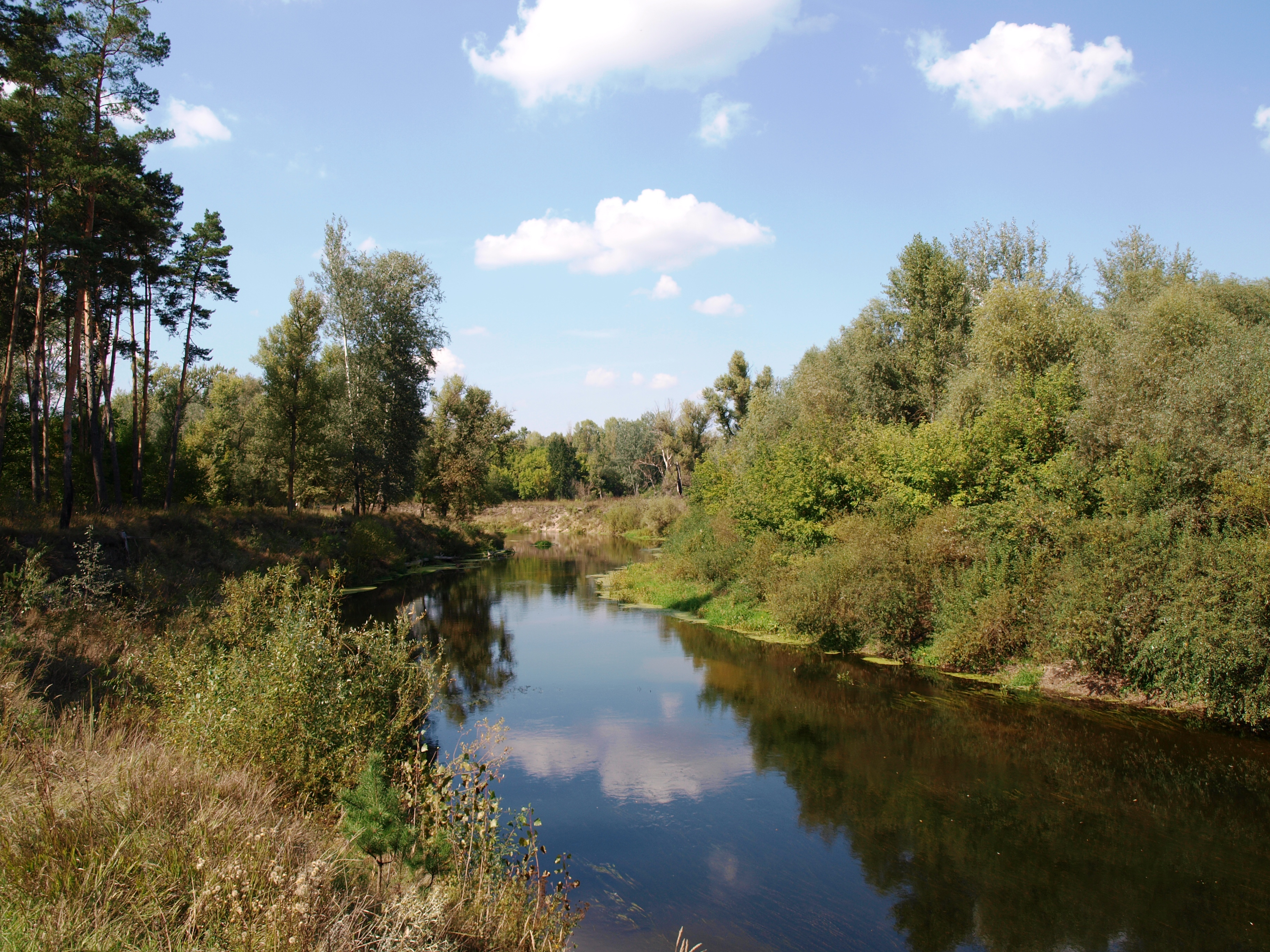
Vorskla River near Novi Sanzary

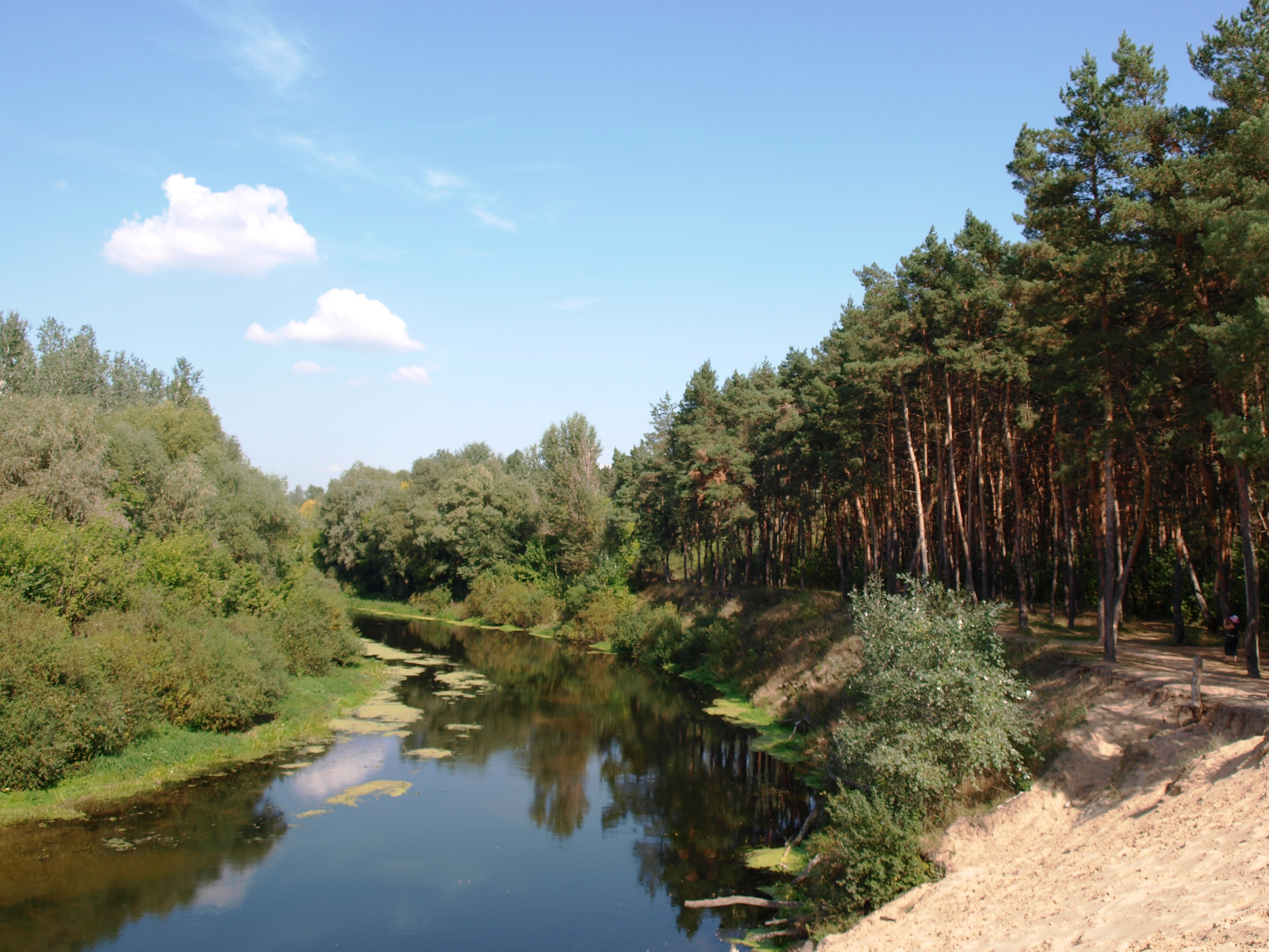
Vorskla River near Novi Sanzary

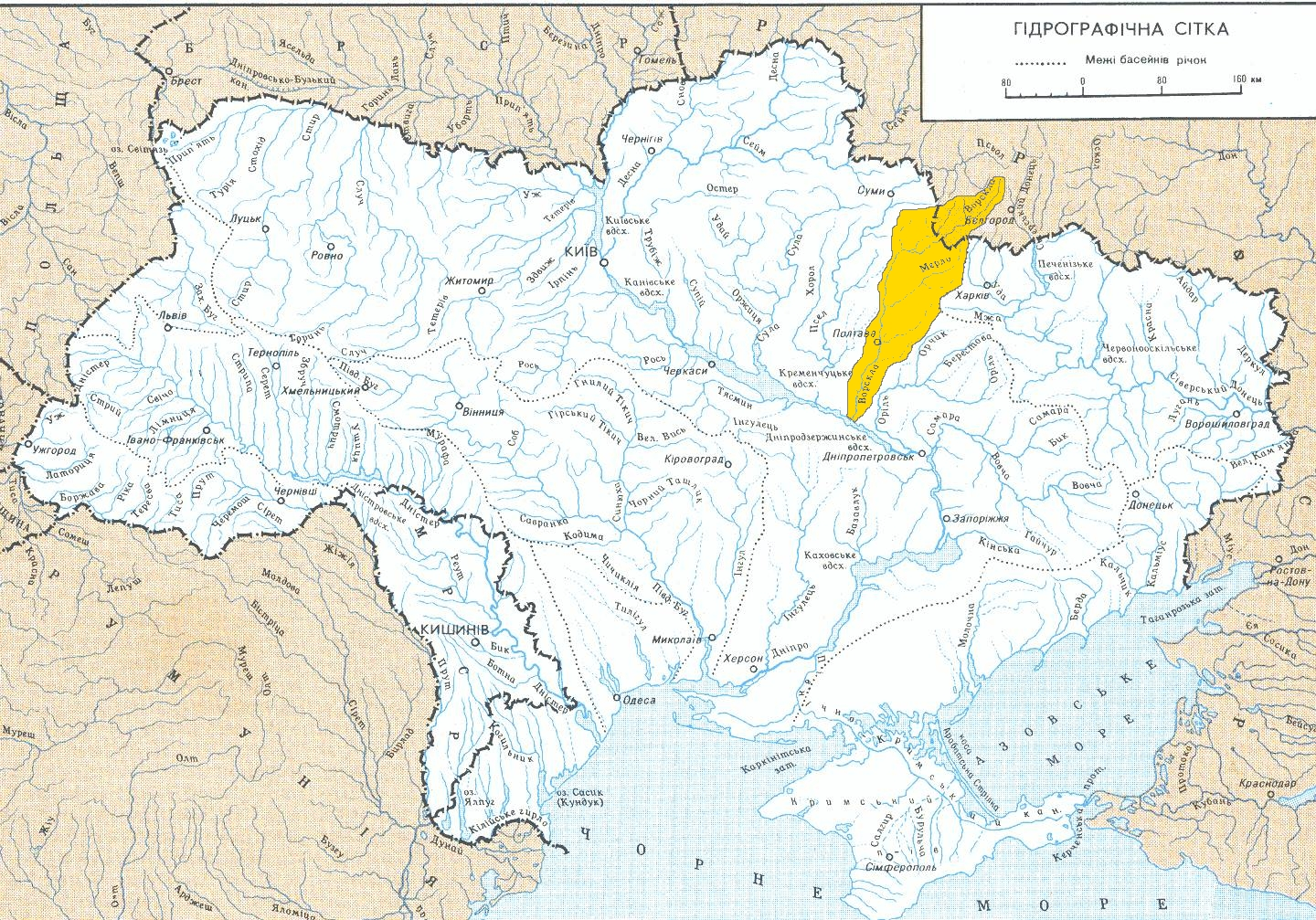
Drainage basin of Vorskla

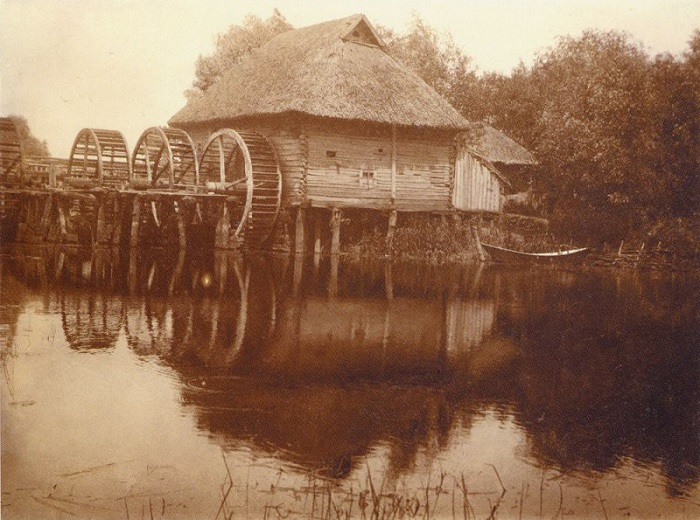
Mills on Vorskla (beginning of 20th century)

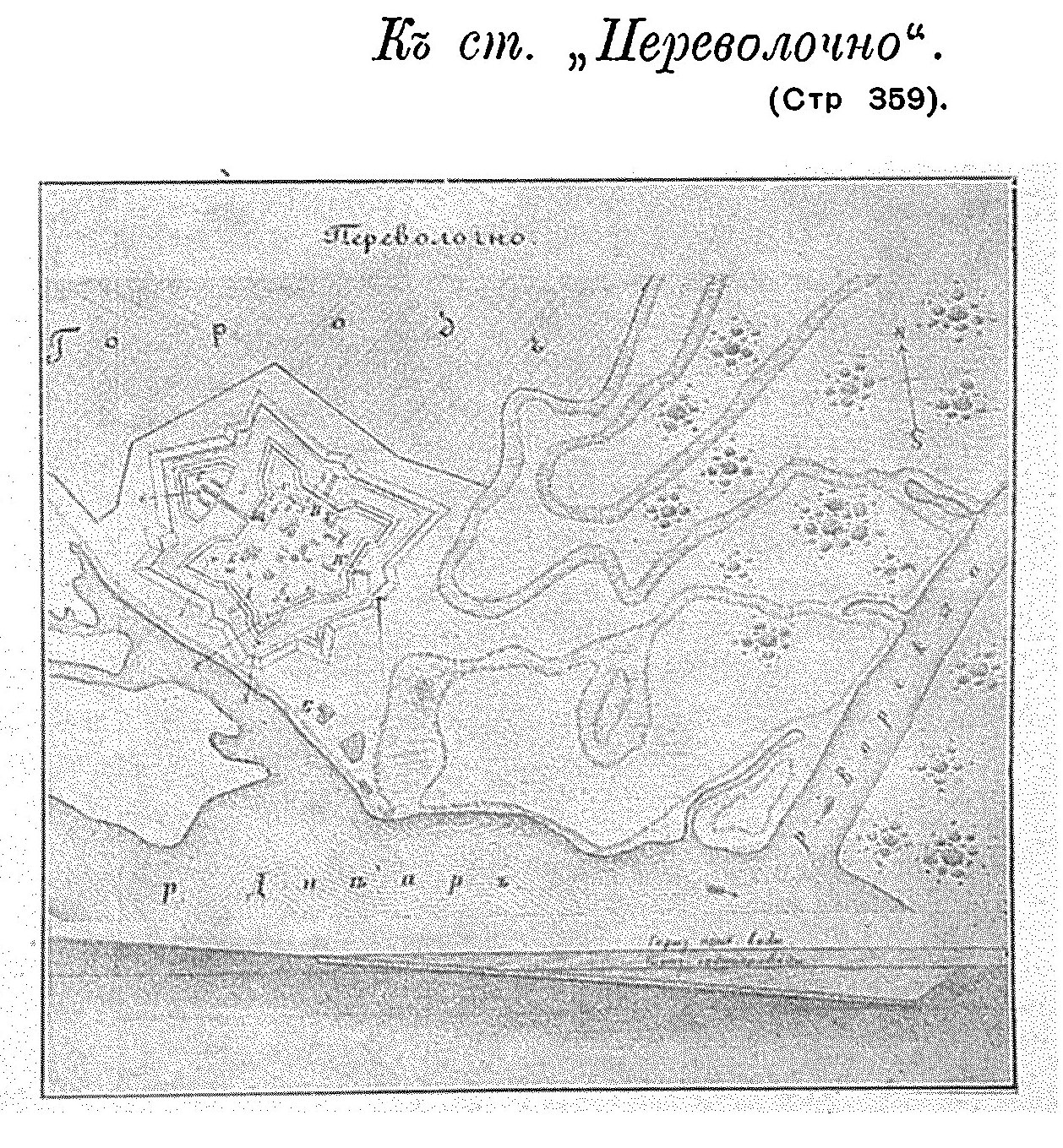
A map with the Perevolochna fortress and the Vorskla mouth
