= Chernechchyna, Okhtyrka Raion, Sumy Oblast =

Village in Sumy Oblast, Ukraine

Chernechchyna Чернеччина
- Village
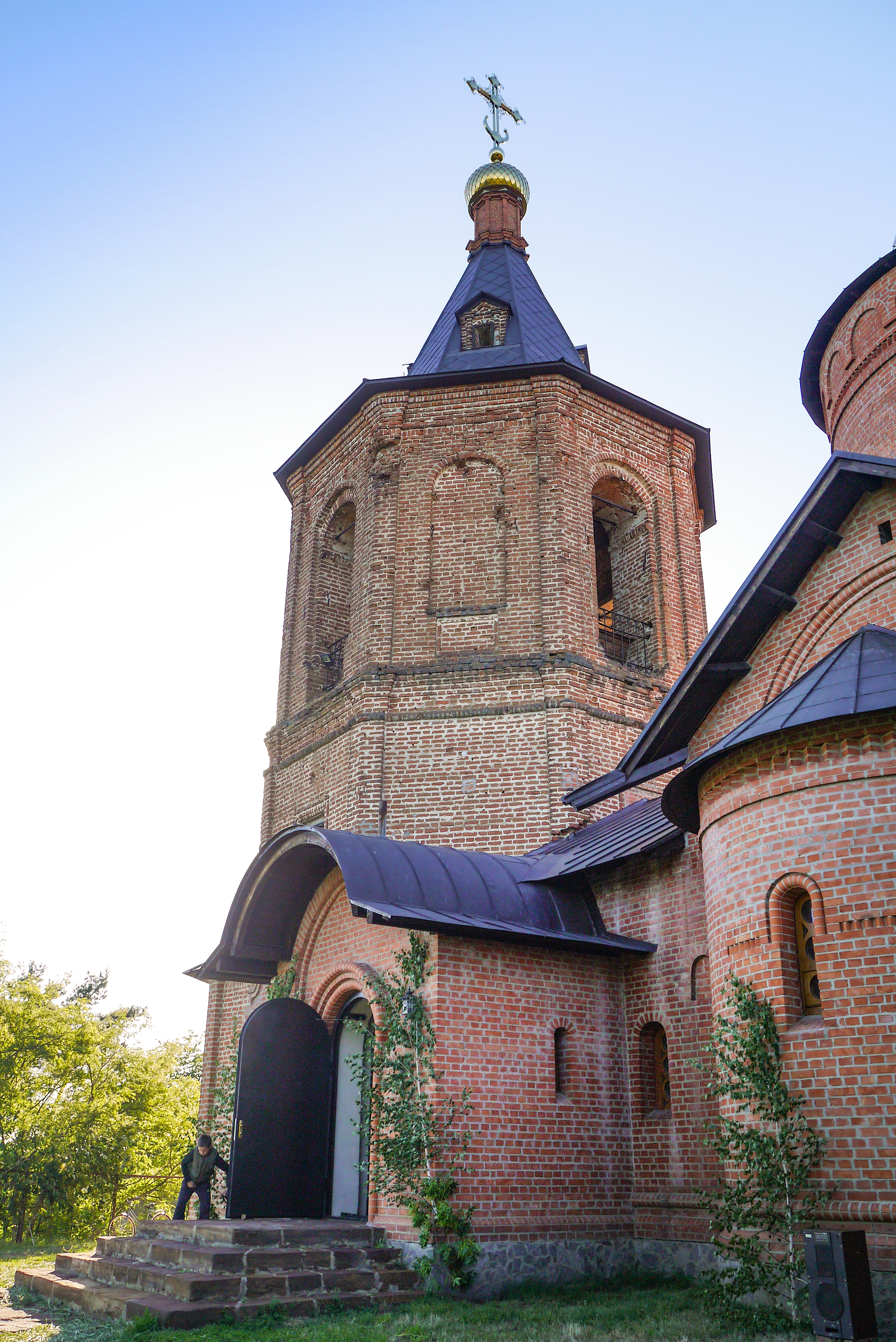
- Okhtyrka Holy Trinity Monastery

- Location of Chernechchyna in Sumy Oblast Location of Chernechchyna in Ukraine
- Coordinates: 50°18′23″N 34°48′31″E
- Country: Ukraine
- Oblast: Sumy Oblast
- Raion: Okhtyrka Raion
- Hromada: Chernechchyna rural hromada
- Established: 17th century

Population
  - Total: 1,746

Chernechchyna (Ukrainian: Чернеччина [t͡ʃerˈnɛt͡ʃːɪnɐ]; Russian: Чернетчина, romanized: Chernetchina) is a village in Okhtyrka Raion, in Ukraine's central Sumy Oblast. It is the administrative centre of Chernechchyna rural hromada, one of the hromadas of Ukraine. Its population is 1,746 (as of 2024).

== History ==
Chernechchyna was established in the late 17th century by serfs subjugated under the Okhtyrka Holy Trinity Monastery, which had itself been established in 1654 after the destruction of another monastery. The Holy Trinity Monastery was closed in 1917 following the October Revolution, being re-consecrated in 2003.

Among the primary sources of income for residents of Chrnechchyna are agriculture, forestry, and mining. Ukrnafta's largest oil refinery, as well as Ukraine's largest oil refinery, is located near the village, as is the Hetman National Nature Park. A mass grave of Soviet soldiers who died during World War II is also in the village.

During the Russian invasion of Ukraine, a humanitarian aid centre was established by the United Nations in Chernechchyna.

== Notable people ==
- Yurii Popov, Ukrainian theatre actor
- Mykhailo Pylypenko, Hero of the Soviet Union
- Yevhen Rudenko, senior lieutenant of the Armed Forces of Ukraine
- Hryhorii Srebrenytskyi, engraver
- Platon Voronko, Soviet Ukrainian poet
