= Okhtyrka =

City in Sumy Oblast, Ukraine

Okhtyrka Охтирка
- City
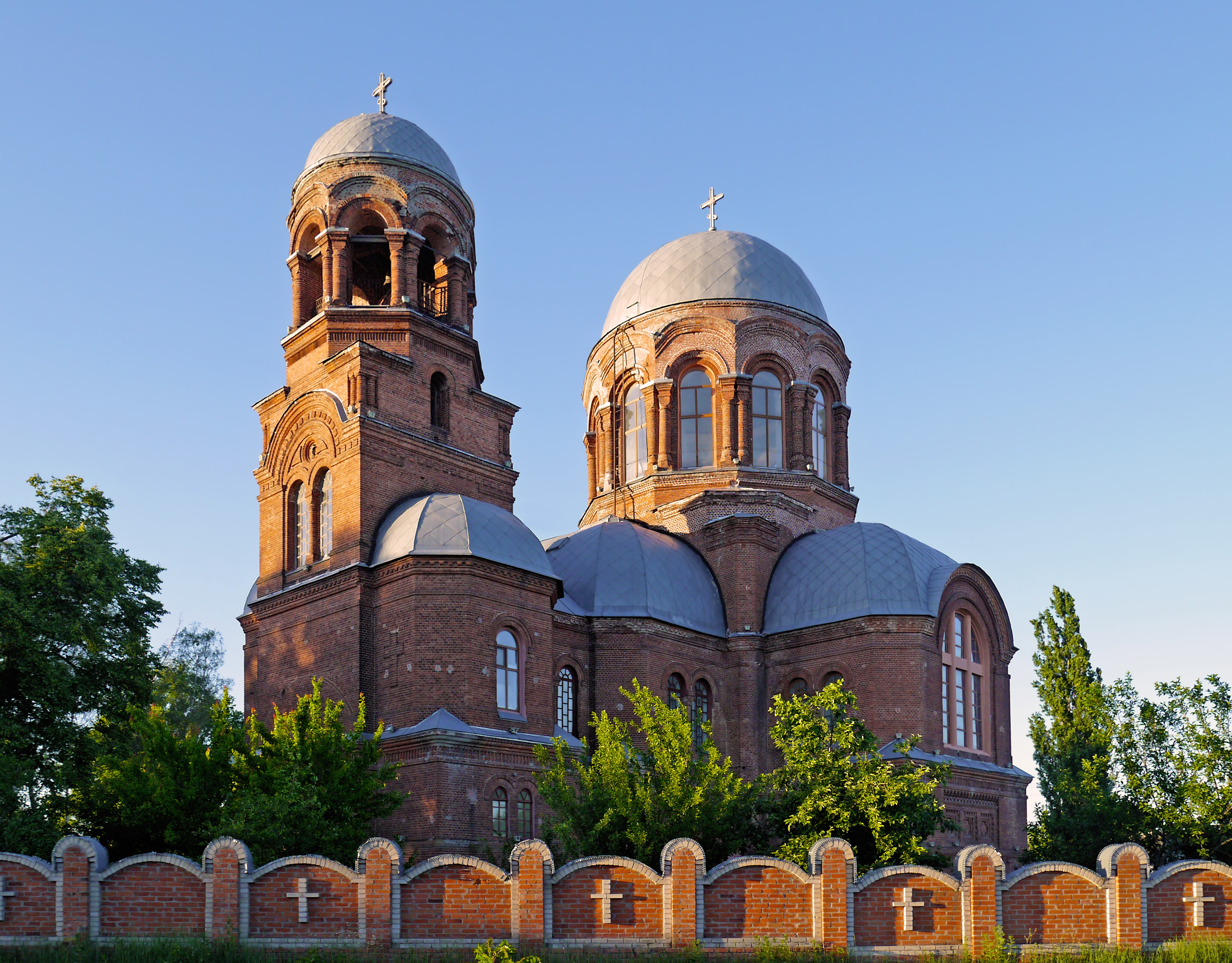
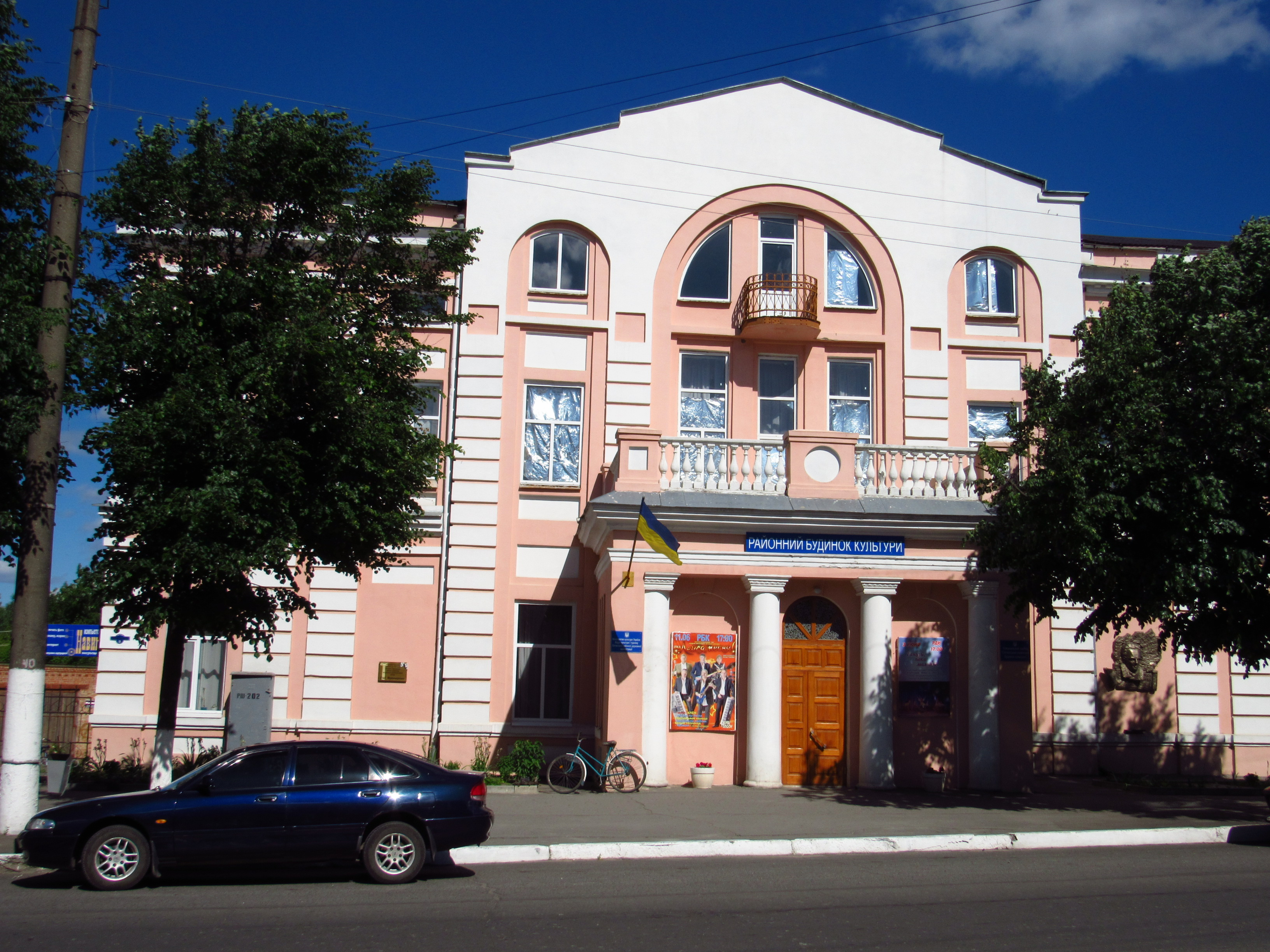
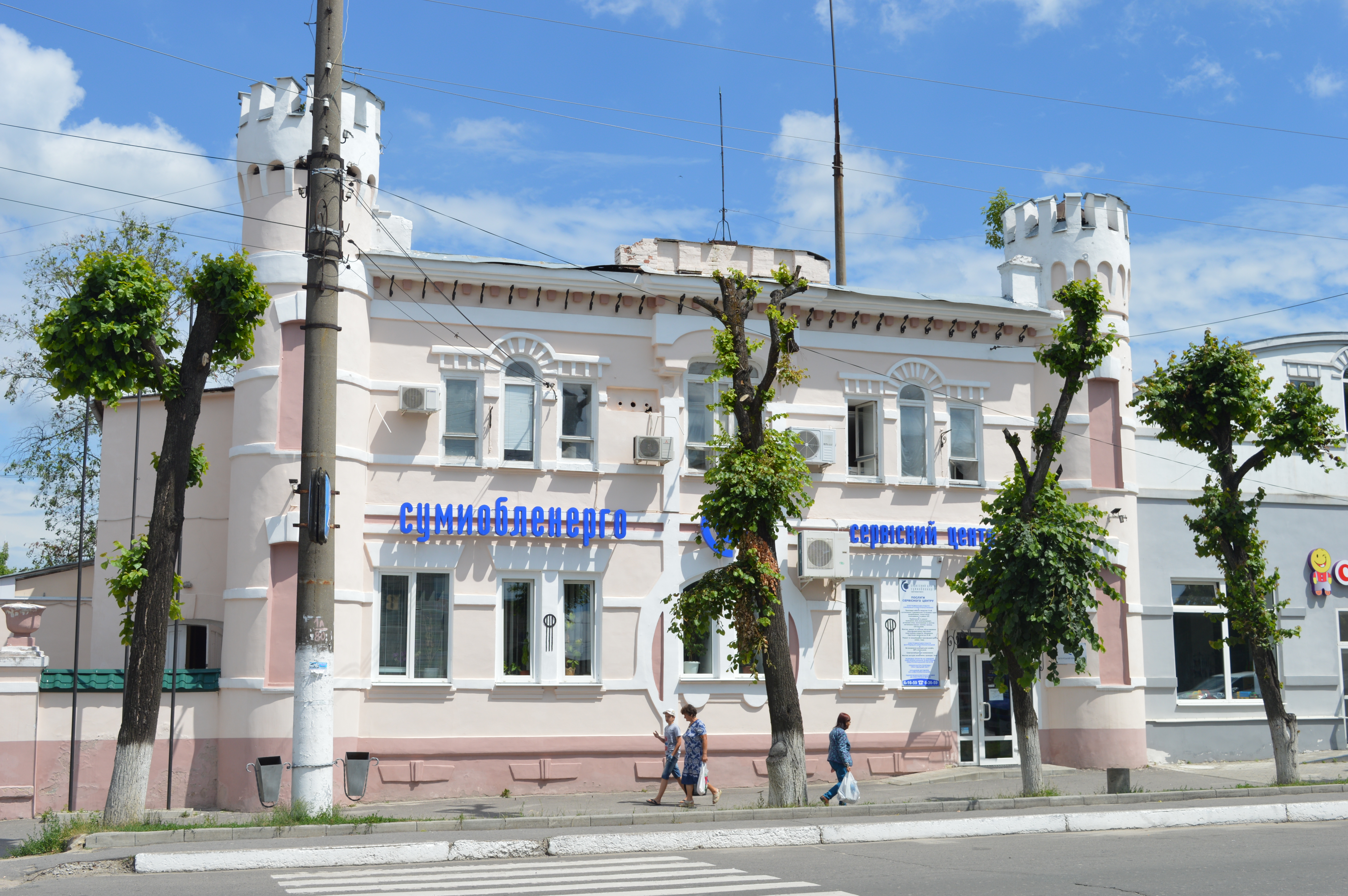
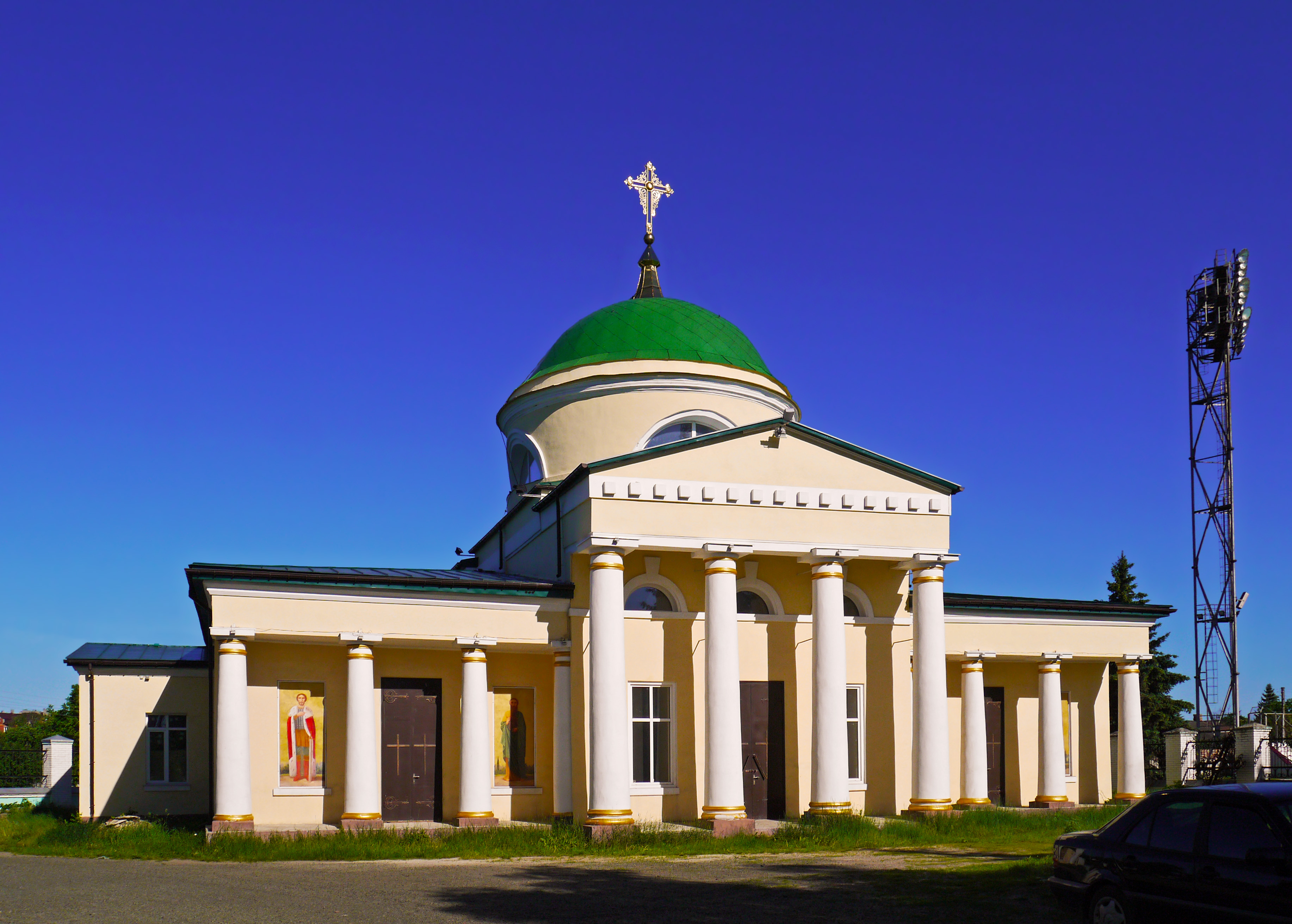
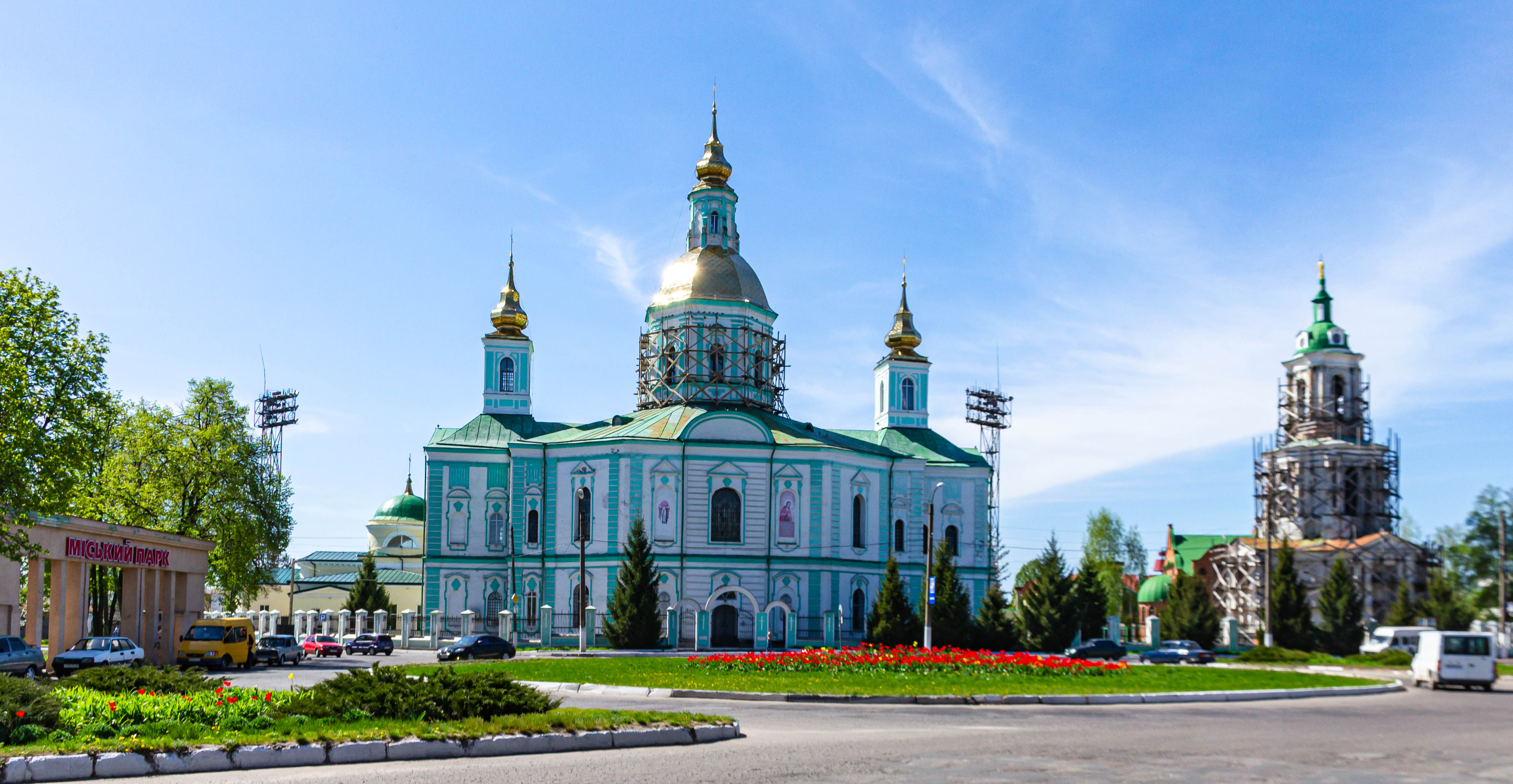
- St. George Church House of Culture Historical power plant Nativity Church Intercession Cathedral

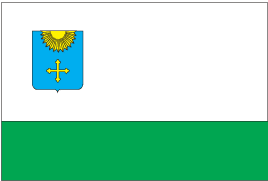
- Flag Coat of arms
- Interactive map of Okhtyrka
- Location within Ukraine Location within Sumy Oblast
- Coordinates: 50.303°N 34.892°E
- Country: Ukraine
- Oblast: Sumy Oblast
- Raion: Okhtyrka Raion
- Hromada: Okhtyrka urban hromada
- Founded: 1641

Area
  - Total: 30 km^{2} (12 sq mi)
- Elevation: 110 m (360 ft)

Population (2022)
  - Total: 46,660
- Demonym: Охтирська
- Website: Okhtyrka City Council; (Old) Official site of Okhtyrka City Council

Okhtyrka (Ukrainian: Охтирка, IPA: [oxˈtɪrkɐ]; Russian: Ахтырка, romanized: Akhtyrka) is a city in Sumy Oblast, Ukraine. It serves as the administrative center of Okhtyrka Raion within the oblast.

Okhtyrka was once home to Hussars and Cossacks. It was also in the past a regional seat of the Sloboda Ukraine Imperial Region and of the Ukrainian SSR. Since the discovery of oil and gas in 1961, Okhtyrka has come to be known as the "oil capital" of Ukraine. It is home to the former Okhtyrka air base and other historical and religious sites. Some religious buildings in Okhtyrka were almost destroyed in the Russian invasion of Ukraine.

== Name ==
The city of Okhtyrka is located on the banks of the Okhtyrka river. According to the most approved etymology, the city is named after the river.

Some local historians have suggested that the river's name may have originated in the Turkic language, where it can be translated to mean "lazy river," "place of ambush," or "white fort." However, Russian philologist Oleg Trubachyov has pointed out that there is insufficient evidence to support this theory.

Alternatively, linguist Kostiantyn Tyshchenko has suggested that the river's name may have Gothic origins.

== Geography ==
Located south of the Sumy region, Okhtyrka lies in the center of a triangle created by regional centers — Sumy, Kharkiv, and Poltava. The city is on the left bank of the Vorskla River, colloquially known as the 'Blue Pearl' of the Ukrainian rivers.

== History and legends ==
Okhtyrka was first established by migrants from the Polish–Lithuanian Commonwealth who, after escaping Polonization, moved from the Right-bank Ukraine to Sloboda Ukraine. Next to the new settlement, Polish authorities established a border outpost against the Muscovite Belgorod Border Line. The settlement and the outpost were founded on the right bank of the Vorskla River, on the site of an ancient Ruthenian settlement on Ak-tyr Hill (from Turkic — "white rock") in 1641, by Ukrainian Cossacks led by Polish government official Kulczewski. It was named Akhtyrsky.

In 1647, according to the act of demarcation of borders drawn by the Treaty of Polyanovka of 1634, it was ceded by the Kingdom of Poland to the Tsardom of Russia. Akhtyrsk became the last southwestern point of the Belgorod defense line that stretched along the southern border of the Russian state in the middle of the 17th century. In 1650, the Russian authorities reduced the fortress to a mere lookout outpost, next to which soon appeared the Holy Trinity Monastery.

In 1653 on the banks of the Vorskla tributary Okhtyrka a group of migrants from right-bank Ukraine established a settlement which adopted the name of the outpost. In 1654 a fortification was completed, and in 1655–1656 it was further expanded by Russian sluzhilie (service members) led by the Tsar's appointed voivodes Larion Kaminin and Trofim Chernov. In 1656, a group of over 1,000 people from right-bank Ukraine arrived, led by Cossack sotnik Arystov and protopope Antoniy from Zhyvotov (possibly the Kiev Voivodeship).

Being bolstered by this position during the 17th and 18th centuries, Okhtyrka rose to rival Kharkiv. The first census of the city was taken in 1655 by governor of Okhtyrka, Trofim Khrushchev, listing 1,339 residents. In 1655–1658, the settlement was a regimental town of the Okhtyrka Regiment.

In 1718 a tobacco factory started, the first one in Ukraine. Throughout the 18th century Okhtyrka transformed into a center of crafts and trade. Following the 1765 liquidation of the regimental system of administration, Okhtyrka became a center of the Sloboda Ukraine province and then Okhtyrka uyezd of the Kharkov Governorate.

During the Ukrainian War of Independence, from 1917 to 1920, it passed between various factions. Afterwards it was administratively part of the Kharkiv Governorate of Ukraine.

=== 2022 Russian invasion ===
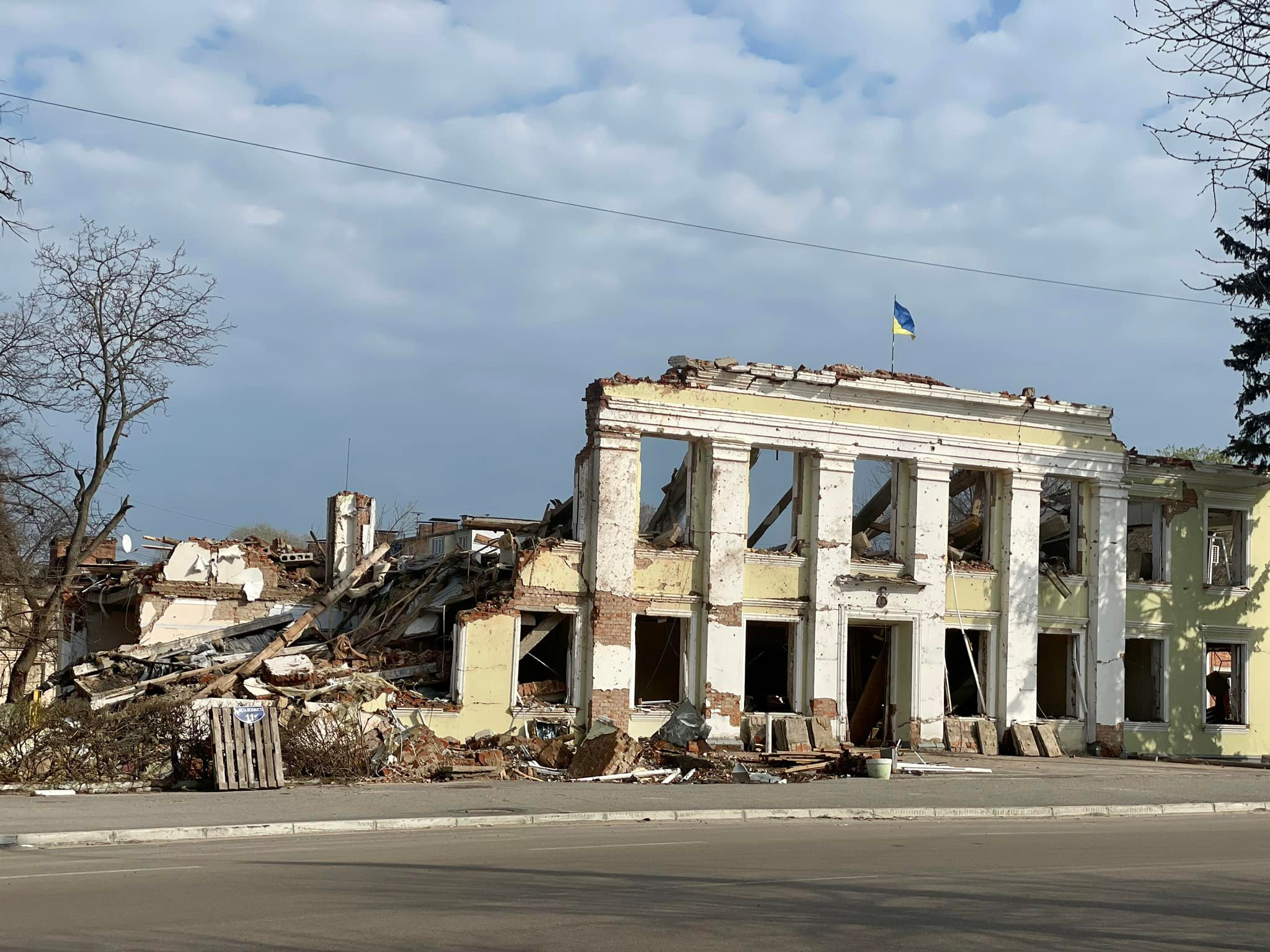
Okhtyrka City Council building after the battle of 2022

Clashes took place in Okhtyrka between the Ukrainian Armed Forces and the invading Russian Armed Forces starting on 24 February 2022. Despite never entering the town, much of Okhtyrka was destroyed in bombing raids carried out by the Russian army.

On the morning of February 25, the city of Okhtyrka was shelled. According to Amnesty International, Russian troops used cluster munitions, including dropping them on a kindergarten. As a result, three people died, including a child. On this day, in the area of Okhtyrka, a Russian Grad fired multiple rockets on a bus for the evacuation of residents. The Chairman of the Sumy Regional State Administration Dmytro Zhyvytskyi said that five more civilians were killed in the city.

On the morning of February 26, other explosions were heard. Later it became known that Russian Armed Forces bombed a military unit and also fired at the Dachny residential area. According to Zhyvytskyi, more than 70 Ukrainian soldiers died as a result of shelling by Russian troops of a military unit in Okhtyrka. On February 27, the chairman of the Sumy Regional State Administration reported that Russian tanks had shot a bus with civilians. On February 28, Russian forces used a vacuum bomb on the city.

On 28 February, Russian forces bombed and destroyed an oil depot in Okhtyrka, also the headquarters of a military base in Okhtyrka was targeted, more than 70 Ukrainian soldiers were killed and 3 wounded when a Russian thermobaric bomb detonated. International law does not prohibit the use of thermobaric munitions, fuel-air explosive devices, or vacuum bombs against military targets. Another 20 soldiers were killed by a Russian attack on the medical department of the base. Their use against civilian populations may be banned by the United Nations (UN) Convention on Certain Conventional Weapons (CCW). Oksana Markarova, the Ukrainian ambassador to the United States, claimed that the use of thermobaric weapons is in violation of the Geneva Conventions.

On March 1, the General Staff of the Armed Forces of Ukraine reported that Russian troops were holding the city surrounded. On March 3, Russian aircraft bombarded the local thermal power plant and fired at residential areas of Okhtyrka. On March 5, the head of the Sumy Regional State Administration announced that the Okhtyrka Combined Heat and Power Plant was completely destroyed after an air bombardment by Russian aircraft, resulting in the death of 5 workers. On March 8, Okhtyrka was subjected to another artillery shelling from Russia; residential areas were damaged. On the night of March 10, a Russian aircraft bombed Okhtyrka twice; a bombing attack was carried out on the Kachanovsky GPP of PJSC Ukrnafta. At noon on March 13, as a result of Russian shelling, along Kyiv street No. 2, the gas station BVS No. 22 was on fire. On the night of March 13–14, Russian aircraft bombed the city again, resulting in the death of three civilians. On March 16, the Russian military began to retreat. On March 20, active hostilities continued in the Okhtyrka Raion.

On March 24, 2022, in order to celebrate the accomplishments, mass heroism and resilience of citizens identified in the defense of their city during the repulse of the armed aggression of the Russian Federation, by Decree of the President of Ukraine No. 164/2022, the city of Okhtyrka was awarded the honorary distinction "Hero City of Ukraine".

Russians, using prohibited means of warfare, carried out an air bombardment of the most densely populated residential area of Okhtyrka, Dachnyi neighborhood. As a result of the bombing, at least 15 residential high-rise and private houses, civil infrastructure facilities, and power lines were destroyed or damaged. According to the Emergency Situations Ministry of Ukraine in Okhtyrka, rescuers were able to free an injured woman from the rubble of damaged houses and also found the body of one deceased person. According to preliminary data, one person died. On March 25, Russian aircraft bombed Okhtyrka again. On March 30, public utilities in Okhtyrka began repairing damaged houses. By April 21, only 24,000 of the town's original population of 48,000 were left. In July, Okhtyrka suffered severe power issues due to damage on the plant from a March air raid.

Okhtyrka's mayor Pavlo Kuzmenko credited the Ukrainian resistance in the city with keeping Russian forces away from the major cities of Poltava and Dnipro.

== The coat of arms ==
The town's coat of arms (blue field, golden cross and shining sun above) celebrates the city's visiting pilgrims. It was introduced by Simon Bekenshtein on September 21, 1781, and reinstated in 1991 by the city council.

== Population ==
Historical population
Year	Pop.	±%
1867	17,411	—
1900	25,965	+49.1%
2001	50,400	+94.1%
2022	46,660	−7.4%

=== Ethnicity ===
Distribution of the population by ethnicity according to the 2001 census:

Ethnic groups in Okhtyrka
	percent
Ukrainians	87.92%
Russians	8.42%
Belarusians	0.46%
Gypsies	0.16%
Armenians	0.14%
Tatars	0.06%
Georgians	0.05%
Poles	0.04%
Azerbaijanis	0.04%
Ashkenazi Jews	0.04%

=== Language ===
Distribution of the population by native language according to the 2001 census:

Language	Percentage
Ukrainian	87.09%
Russian	9.97%
other/undecided	2.94%

== Military history ==
In 1655–1658 the Okhtyrka Cossack Regiment was formed and lasted until 1765, when, ordered by Catherine II, all Cossack regiments were dismantled. In 1709, the territory of the Cossack regiment became the scene of fierce fighting with the Swedes. For more than a hundred years the Cossack regiment had fought against the invasion of the Tatars, and the troops had both defeats and victories over the Turks, Tatars, and the Swedes. Later, Okhtyrka's Cossack regiment reformed into hussars.

=== Okhtyrka Fortress ===
Okhtyrka, like all of Sloboda Ukraine, had an disorderly city layout. The central core of the city was represented by the fortress, which occupied an elevated place; the buildings fitting into the terrain without any order.

Okhtyrka's fort sat on the shore of the small Okhtyrka river where it makes a loop, forming a natural protection. The fortress was surrounded by numerous lakes, complicating any potential approaches to it.

The fortress had the shape of an irregular quadrilateral, and occupied the area of the present city center, from the river to the location of today's "Intercession Cathedral" outside the castle. It was surrounded by a wooden fence with five stone and fifteen wooden towers, as well as two bastions. The fortress gates had drawbridges. Around the castle a moat was dug and earth mound built with caponier at the corners. The moat was filled with water.

In the early 18th century, Cossacks of the Okhtyrka regiment took an active part in the Great Northern War, recapturing the Swedish and Russian lands bordering the Baltic Sea. On December 26, 1707, Peter the First came to the city to personally verify the readiness of the garrison and hold a council of war.

=== Hussars ===
Okhtyrka Hussars played an important role in the fight against Napoleon during the War of 1812. They participated in the battles of Smolensk, Vyazma, and Borodino. For services in battle the regiment was honored to open the parade of victors at the entry of Allied troops in Paris. In this regiment, the Russian poet Dimitry Davydov served as one of the leaders of the partisan movement during the War in 1812, as well as the Russian composer Alexander Alyabyev. In 1823, the regiment was commanded by a future Decembrist, A. Muravyev, and Mikhail Lermontov, a Russian poet.

Many people fought and died in WWI and even more in WWII. The fighting around Okhtyrka was fearsome and resulted in a prominent common grave of Soviet soldiers in the area.

=== Soviet times ===
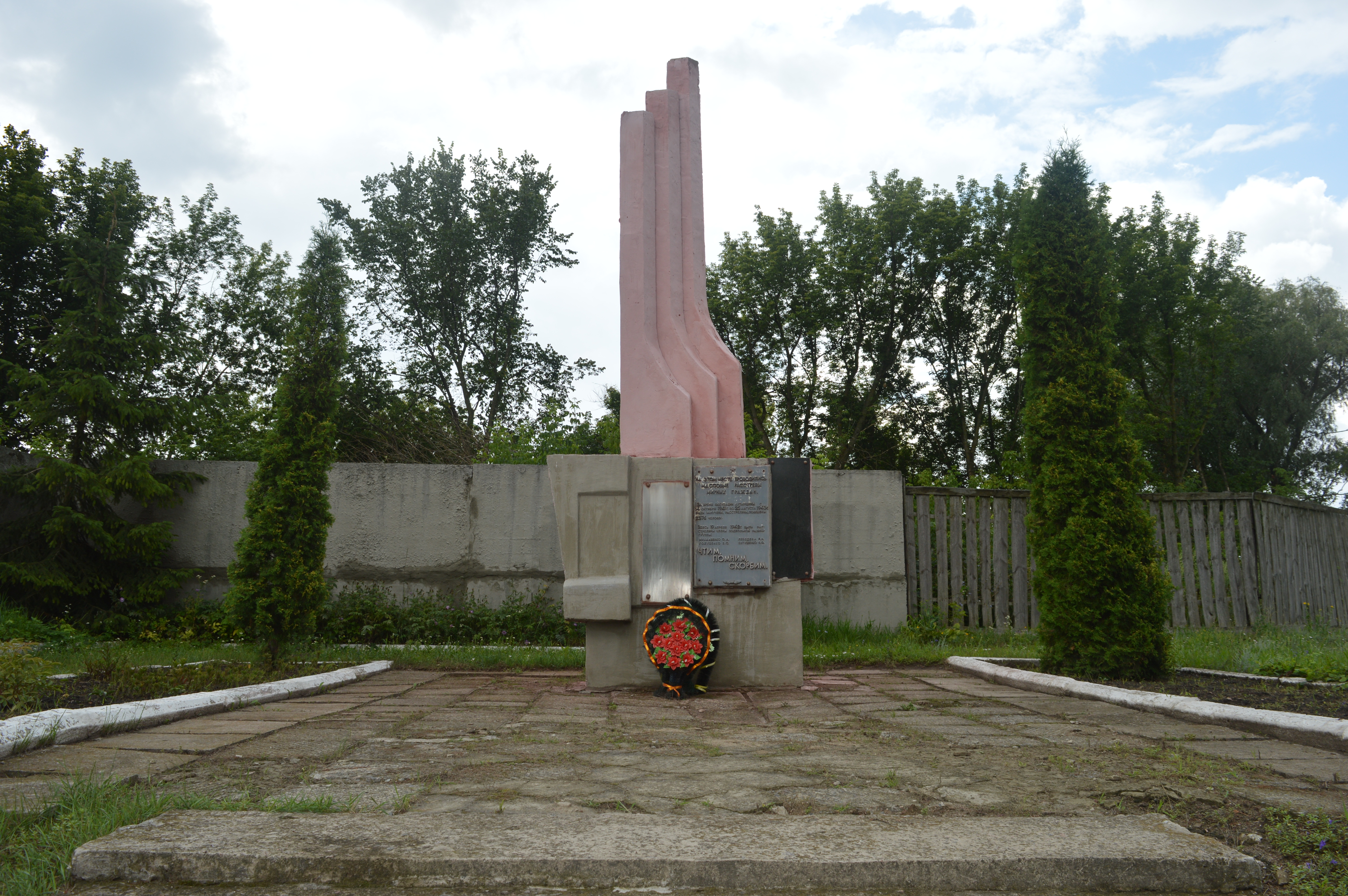
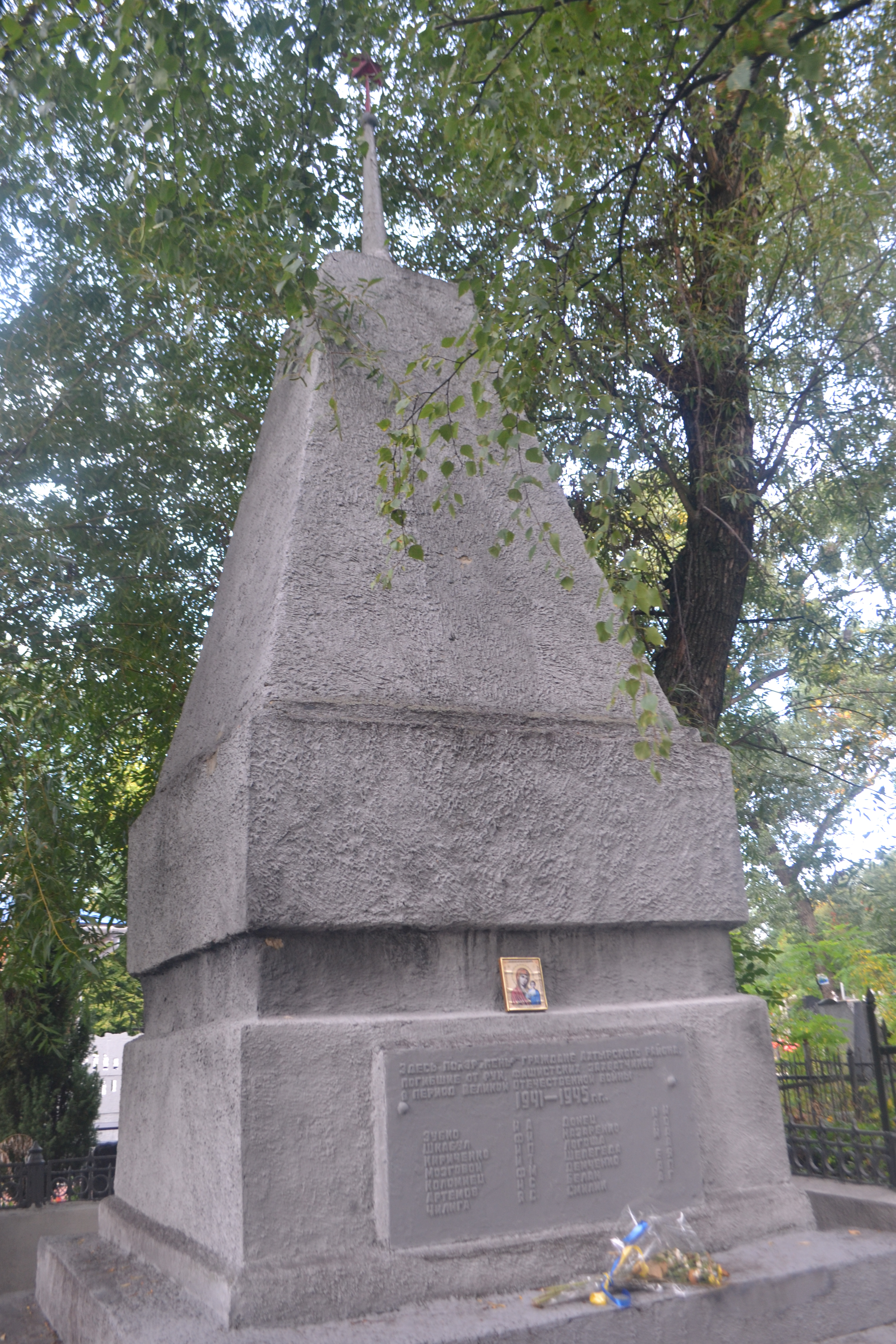
Mass graves of victims of Nazi Germany

During World War II, Okhtyrka was occupied by the German Army from 15 October 1941 to 23 February 1943 and again from 11 March to 25 August 1943. The Germans operated a Dulag transit camp for prisoners of war in 1941–1942. Okhtyrka was near the southern flank of the Kursk Bulge, and fighting in the city in the summer of 1943 was fierce. Afterwards, the city and its surroundings built monuments to those who fought in the war: the eternal flame of remembrance in the city park, Valley of Heroes, T-34 tank on a pedestal in one of the city's entrances, the Mound of Glory, etc. After the war, a large army garrison was established in the area of Okhtyrka. Military parades in the city, arranged on the occasion of Soviet holidays, were comparable with the Ukrainian capital city due to the number of participating vehicles and machinery of all kinds.

In the last decade of the Soviet period, Okhtyrka was militarized, housing several army regiments. The Dachny precinct became a home to officers' families from the former USSR. Many of them served in Eastern Bloc countries (East Germany, Hungary, Czechoslovakia etc.), took part in Vietnam and Afghanistan wars, and served as consultants in Cuba. As the USSR started to fall apart, the machinery and ballistic rockets were transported to Russian territory, however it took much longer for the regiments to move or to transform. Many military personnel or their families stayed in Okhtyrka or still have connections to the city.

== Architecture ==
There are many wooden and brick churches in the area.

On "Monastery Hill", overlooking the Vorskla river 4–5 km north of Okhtyrka, stands the Holy Trinity Monastery, established in 1654. The grounds have been practically destroyed during the Soviet era with exception of its bell tower, that kept some of its structure intact. The Russian Revolution of October, World War II and the anti-religious policies of the Soviet era were factors. It has been reopened following restoration of religious life in Ukraine and Russia, for the 4th time during its history. Mostly surviving on donations and on the work of enthusiastic monks and volunteers, with Kyiv Church blessings, it has started to rebuild and has become one of the main religious places for Ukrainian and Russian Orthodox Christian worshipers in the region.

=== Cathedral and its relics ===
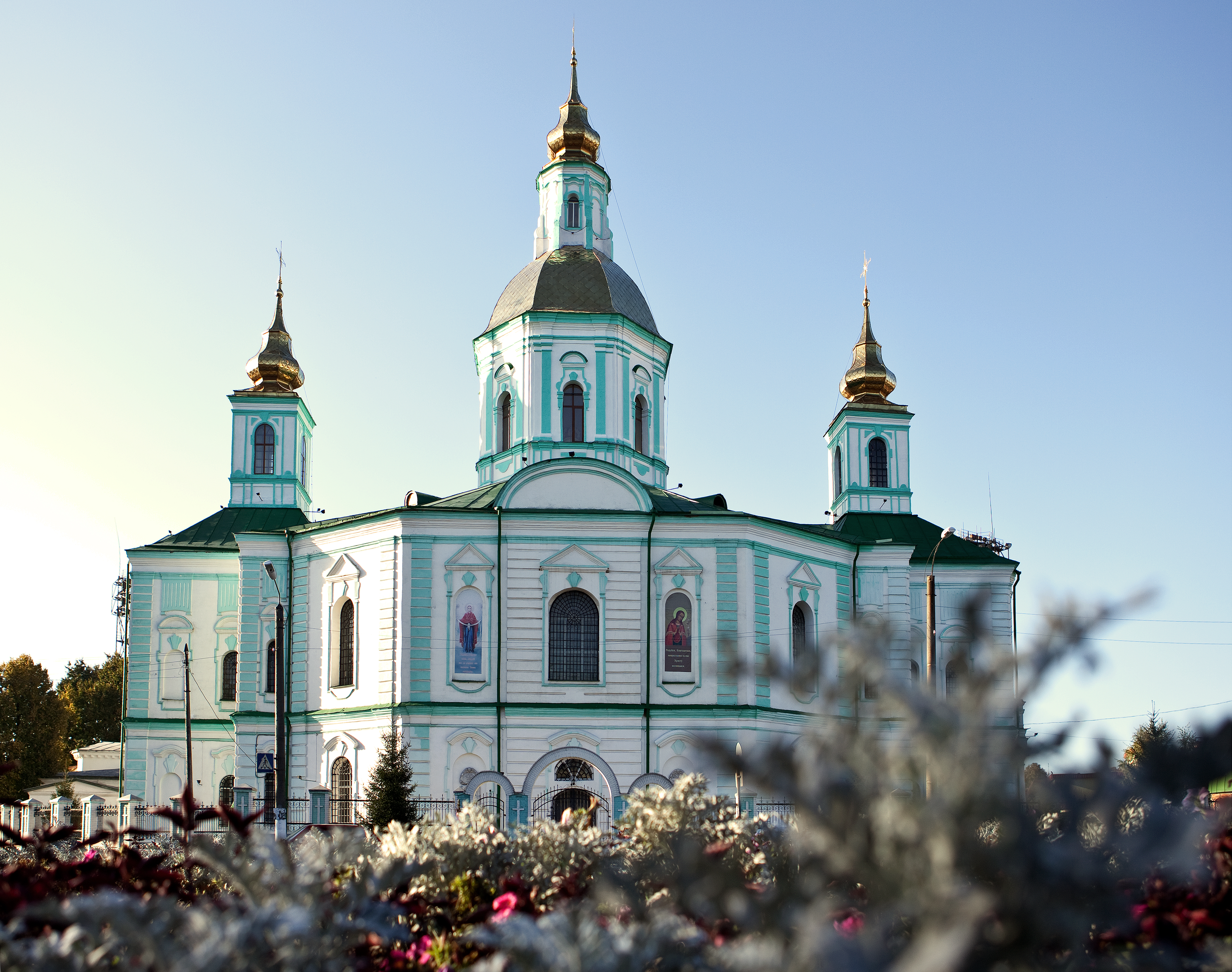
The Cathedral of the Theotokos (1753–1768)

The Cathedral of the Holy Virgin (1753–1762) was formerly attributed to Bartolomeo Rastrelli and now to Dmitry Ukhtomsky with managing architect S. Dudinsky. Its architecture is the traditional Sloboda Ukrainian Baroque with elements derived from the imperial capital. The interior is decorated with Ionic pilasters and paintings on sails. It suffered during the Great Patriotic War. Restorations began in 1970–1972 but were completed only after the collapse of the USSR. The construction is unique in its three-dimensional solution and has no analogy in Ukrainian Baroque architecture.

Nearby stands the Nativity Church (1825), which resembles a palace rather than a church. The cathedral belltower was built in three tiers and adorned with a statuary in 1783.

==== Miraculous icon of Okhtyrka ====
Iconography of Okhtyrka originates in Italo-Greek art. Usually pictured is a half-length image of the Blessed Virgin Mary with folded hands in supplication, with to her left Jesus Christ, crucified on the cross.

The Okhtyrka miraculous icon, July 2, 1739, is kept in the church.

The story is that the image, which was said to emanate radiance, was uncovered by priest Vasily (Basil) Danilov in the grassland of Protection Church while he was mowing and took it home. After three years later, the priest entered the room on the day of the feast of the Protection and was struck by the extraordinary light of the icon. He prayed devoutly near the icon but said nothing to anyone else. Later, the priest saw the Virgin in a dream, and heard her command him to remove dust from it and to clean it with water. On his awakening he executed the command. He left the water that he used to clean the icon in a vessel, planning to take it to the river the next morning to empty and to wash the vessel. Again, he fell asleep and dreamed he was going to the river the next morning. He heard the voice of Mother of God tell him to return home and keep the water, and that it would heal any who suffered from fever. He had a daughter who had long experienced fevers so when he awoke, he gave her the water to drink, and his daughter soon recovered.

Later, the priest asked Ioan (John) the iconographer, to repair damaged paint on the icon. Knowing of its miraculous healing qualities, Ioan washed it with water and gave the water to his son, who suffered from fever, who also recovered. While preparing for the restoration that night he heard the icon say: "Get up! Now is the time to return the icon to where you took it. Fix it you cannot." The painter prayed before the icon until morning, and took it back to Basil, who, convinced of its miraculous power, put it in the protection of the Church. Fever sufferers began to pray to the icon and were miraculously healed in great numbers.

The news of the miracles of the icon spread to the Imperial Court. The Mother of God appeared in a vivid dream to the widow Baroness von Veydel, who visited Okhtyrka in 1748. The Lady told her that her days were numbered and ordered her to give away her estate, distributing it to the needy, and promised protection to her two young daughters. The baroness rushed to distribute the property and died five days later. The news about this reached the Empress, and Elizabeth took the orphans to the court, raised them and married one to Count Panin, and the other to Count Chernyshov. Both of them made generous contributions to the cathedral, where the icon remained until the day they died.

In 1751 the Holy Synod honored the icon of Okhtyrka as miraculous. In 1753 Empress Elizabeth donated funds and a stone Cathedral of the Holy Virgin was erected where the icon was found. The icon was kept in the cathedral until its theft in 1903 during its voyage to St. Petersburg for restoration.

The icon found its way to Harbin, and was acquired by S A Stepanov. According to the Harbin Archpriest Nikolai Trufanova, who repeatedly visited the Okhtyrka icon in Okhtyrka, it was the icon that had gone missing. He confirmed that Stepanov acquired the icon of Okhtyrka. In the 1950s, the son of Stepanov brought it to Brazil and then to San Francisco, where he gave it to the Committee of the Russian Orthodox youth as a blessing. Then Okhtyrka icon was placed under the jurisdiction of Sydney Archbishop Hilarion (Kapral).

Blessed copies of Okhtyrka icon

The icon of Okhtyrka, which is revered as a healer of many diseases, has been copied with the blessing of the church in small numbers that were distributed mainly in the south of Russia, in Kharkiv diocese. One such icon from the 18th or 19th century is kept in Moscow, in the main aisle of the church of Resurrection in the Arbat (ap. Philip) Jerusalem monastery. The Okhtyrka icon is called "Samara" – the main shrine of Samara Nicholas male monastery.

In 1975, the information that the lost Okhtyrka icon was in San Francisco reached the Soviet Union. In 1995 the Metropolitan Nicodemus of Kharkiv (Rusnak) brought a copy of the icon, and handed it to Okhtyrka St. Basil's Cathedral. In connection with this event, a procession on the third day after the Holy Trinity with other icons placed the Okhtyrka icon into the Holy Trinity Monastery. These processions occurred yearly from 1844 on the Saturday of Pentecost, and later the icons were transferred back on the feast of All Saints. On June 15, 1999, Okhtyrka held celebrations to mark the 260th anniversary of the phenomenon of the Okhtyrka icon.

List of temples in honor of Okhtyrka icons

Temples in the village Chernetove Bryansk region, Russia; Akhtyrsky nunnery in the village Gusevka Volgograd region, Russia; Church in the village of Akhtyrka Sergiev Posad, Moscow Region, Russia; Chapel at the Republican Hospital in Petrozavodsk; Akhtyrsky Cathedral in City Orel, Russia.

== Culture ==
People who live in Okhtyrka have origins in different nationalities with the mainstream culture being predominantly Ukrainian and Russian. This is also influenced by Orthodox faith traditions, the surrounding Christian architecture, and the religious life and history of the city. In recent years, following the independence of Ukraine, there is a noticeable shift to Ukrainian culture. The spoken language is Ukrainian and Russian, or a mixture of both, with Ukrainian language dominating.

Okhtyrkivtsi (residents of Okhtyrka) celebrate: the Day of the City on August 25, in honor of liberation of the city on this day in 1943 from Nazi German invaders, Ukrainian independence day, Patronal feast days, Carnival, a festival in honor of the holiday of Ivan Kupala and many others.

== Economy ==
=== Tobacco ===
In 1718, the first Russian tobacco manufacture began, which was attributed to several villages (944 peasant households), but proved unprofitable. In 1727 the company sold its treasury to private individuals. The tobacco factory was served by an isolated plantation (50 acres), from which were collected seven thousand pounds of tobacco.

=== Oil and gas ===
Since the discovery of oil and gas in 1961, Okhtyrka has become the "oil capital of Ukraine". The Okhtyrka region produces the most oil in Ukraine.

=== Other industries ===
In the early 20th century there were manufacturers of light woollen stuffs and a trade in corn, cattle and the produce of domestic industries. The area is fertile, and the orchards produced excellent fruit.

Obolon CJSC has a brewery in Okhtyrka.

== Sports ==
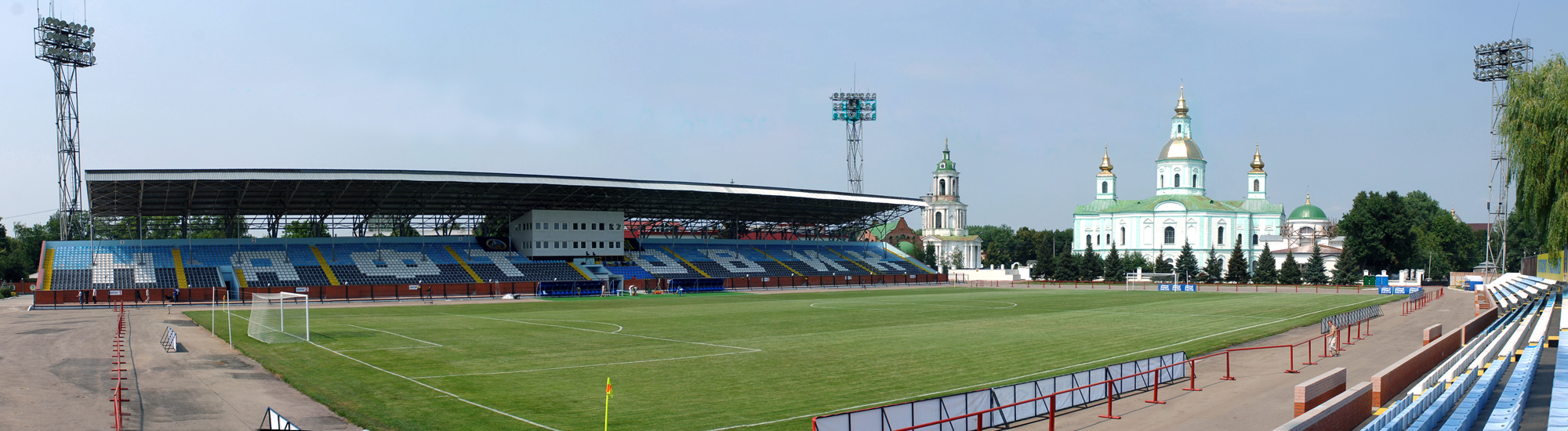
Naftovyk Stadium

Okhtyrka is home to the Ukrainian First League team, FC Naftovyk-Ukrnafta Okhtyrka.

== Notable people who were born or resided in Okhtyrka ==
- Andrei Chikatilo, one of the most famous Soviet serial killers, he studied at the Technical College of Communications Okhtyrka.
- Artem Kotenko, Ukrainian child singer, Ukrainian representative it the Junior Eurovision Song Contest 2024.
- Borys Antonenko-Davydovych, Soviet and Ukrainian writer.
- Ivan Bahrianyi, Ukrainian writer.
- Leonid Pavlovych Maidan, Ukrainian-Russian-Canadian poet. Editor of Ukrainian-language journal in Toronto (Canada) around 1950. Also wrote under the pseudonym 'Dan-May' and 'Leonid May'. Books of poetry published in Canada include 'V Pokhid' (Ukrainian), and 'Stikhi-Lirika' Academia Press, 1949, (Russian). He is formally recognized as a Russian emigre poet by the Russian Federation.
- Mikhail Gurevich, Soviet aircraft designer, studied at the gymnasium Okhtyrka.
- Mikhail Yakovlevich Rudinsky, archaeologist.
- Mykola Khvyliovyi, Soviet Ukrainian writer.
- Mykola Zerov, Ukrainian literary critic, poet – a master's sonnets.
- Nikolay Filippovich Batiuk, Soviet military.commander, one of the heroes of the defense of Stalingrad.
- Oleksiy Berest, Soviet officer and veteran of World War II.
- Ostap Vyshnia, Soviet Ukrainian writer, humorist and satirist.
- Pavlo Hrabovsky, Ukrainian poet, translator, member of the revolutionary movement.
- Peter Antonovich Yaroslavsky, architect.
- Peter Ledenyov, Hero of the Soviet Union.
- Platon Voronko, Ukrainian poet and Soviet partisan, lived in Okhtyrka
- Sergey Borodaevsky, economist.
- Svetlana Svetlichnaya, Soviet and Russian theater and film actress, Honoured Artist of the RSFSR (1974).

The city mayor is Igor Alekseev.

== Gallery ==
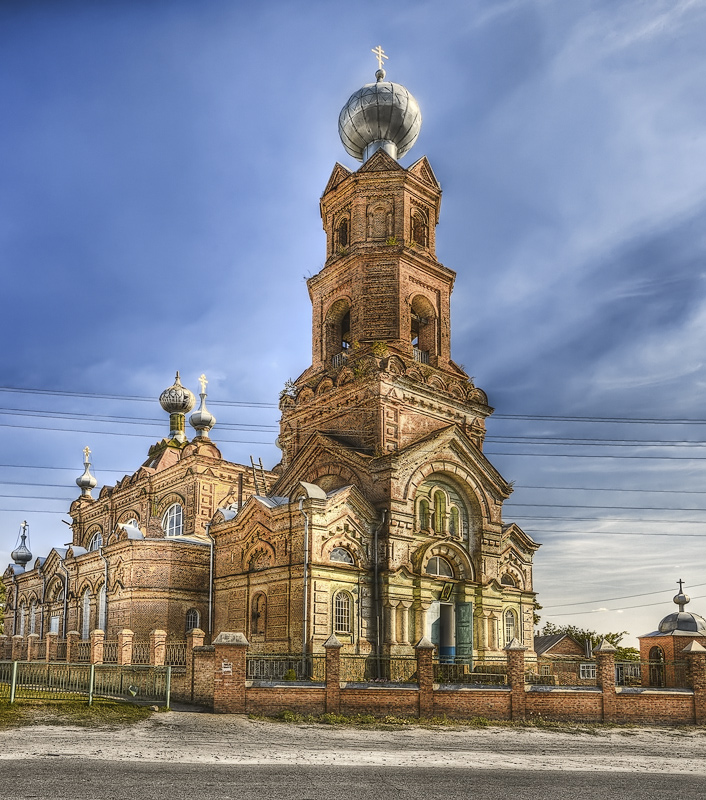
St. Michael Church

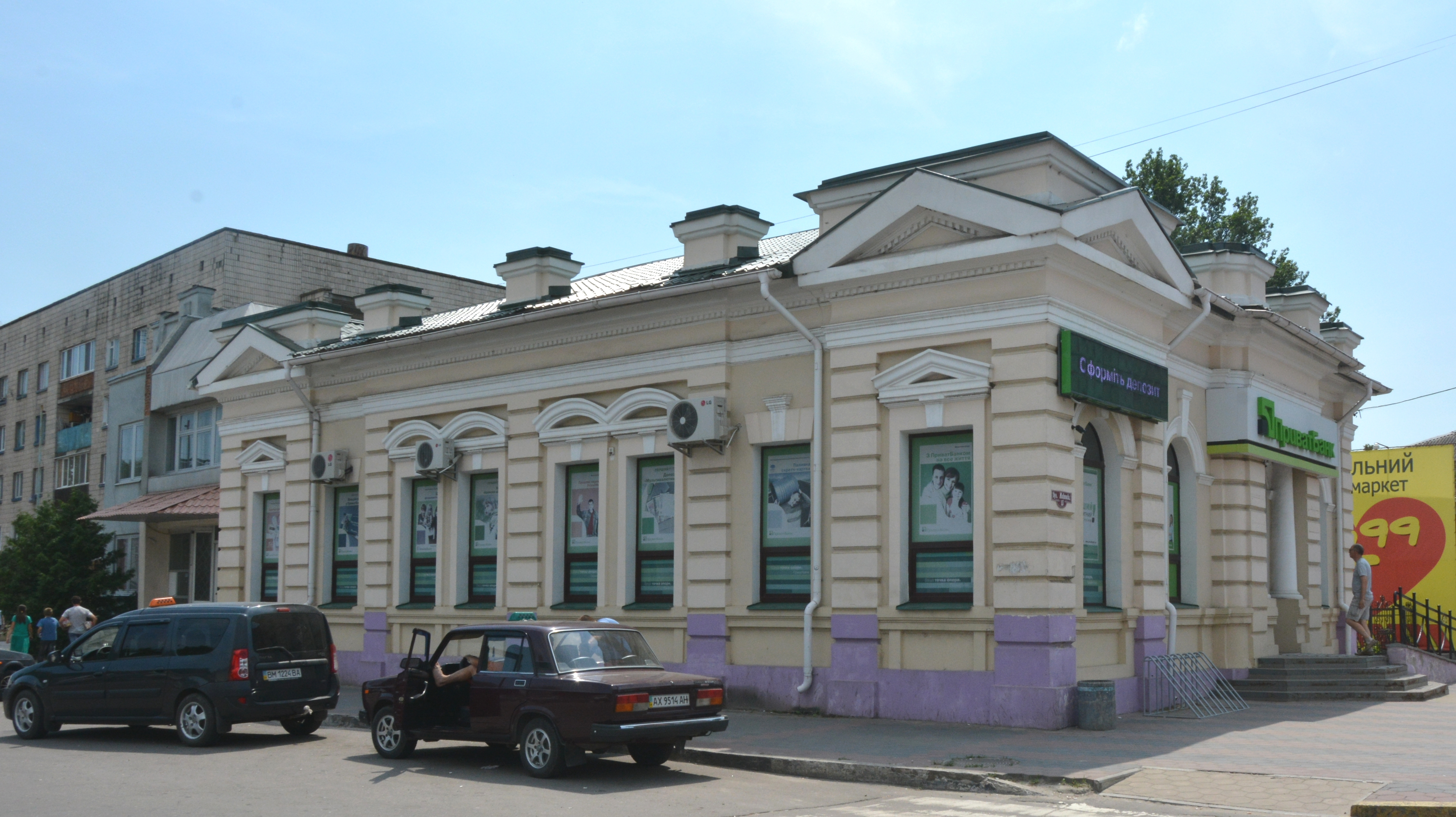
Historical priest's residence

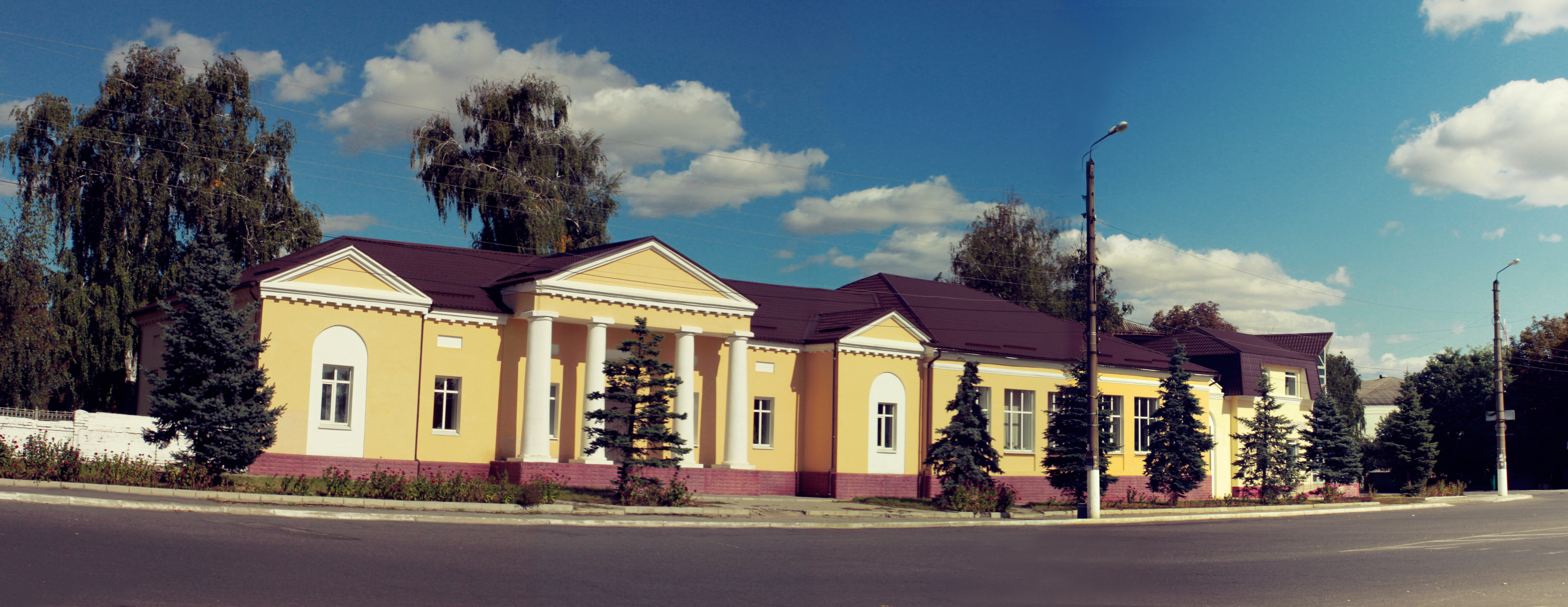
Okhtyrka primary school

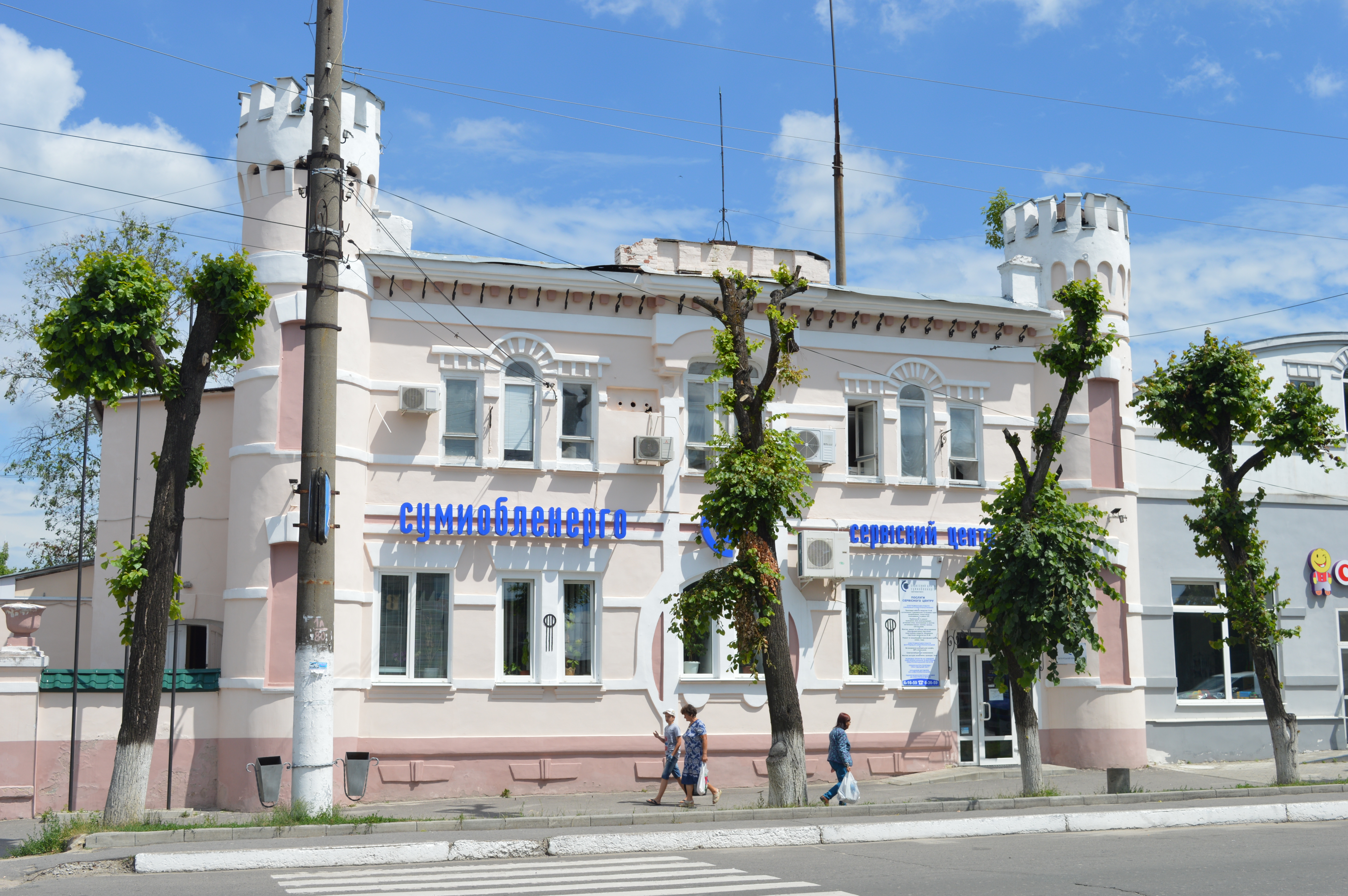
Historical power plant building

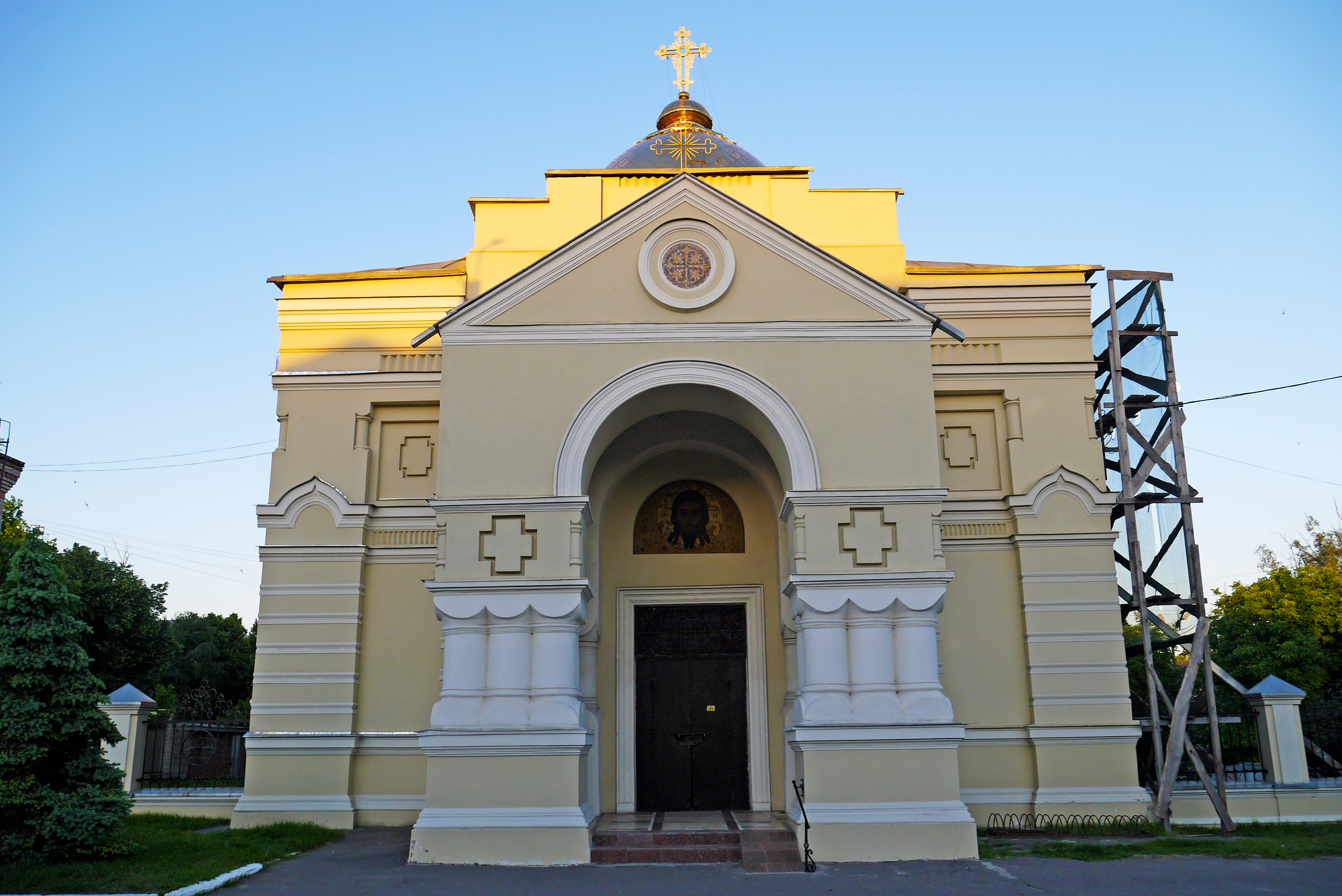
Transfiguration Church

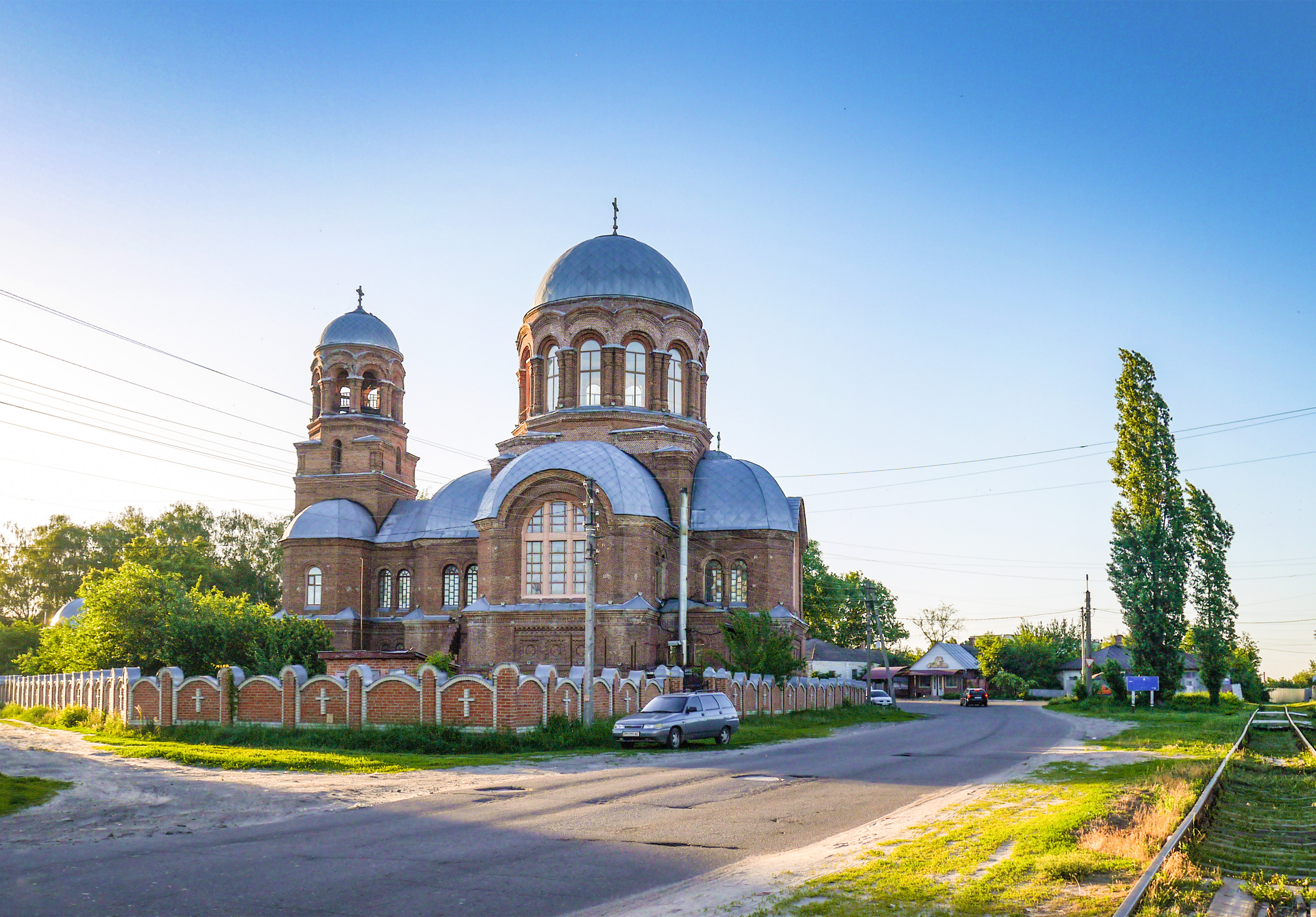
St. George Church

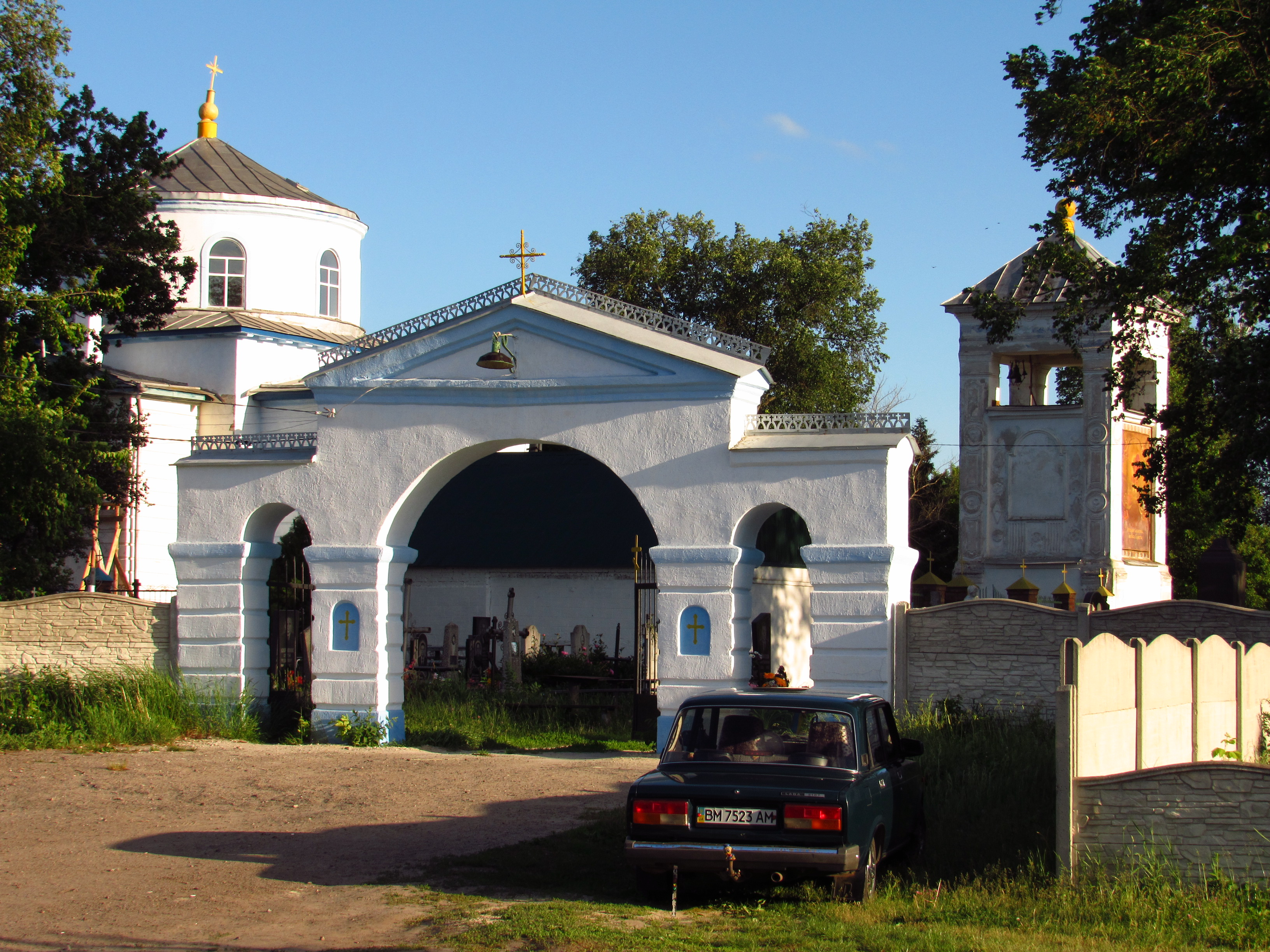
Holy Myrrhbearers Church

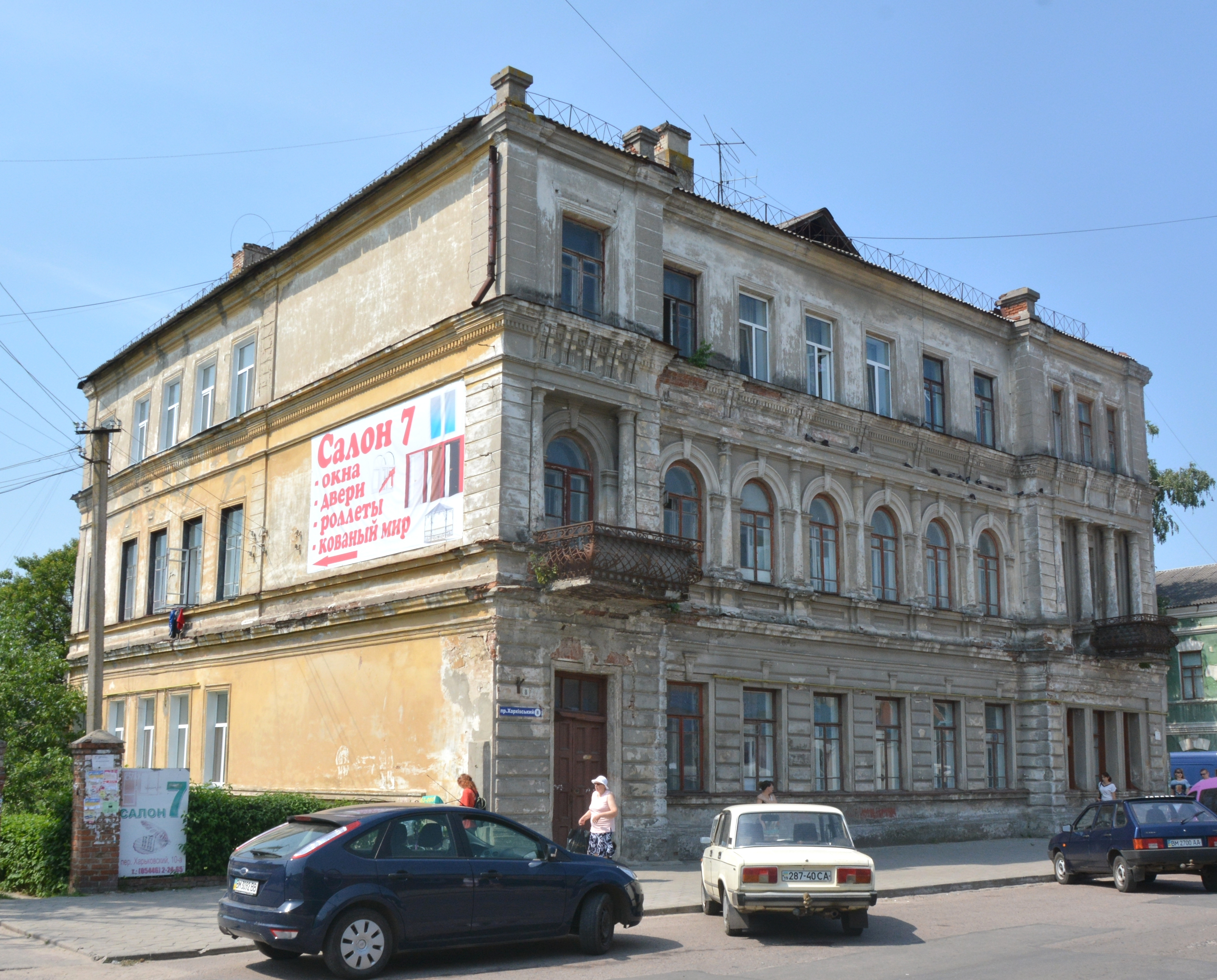
Historical merchant's building

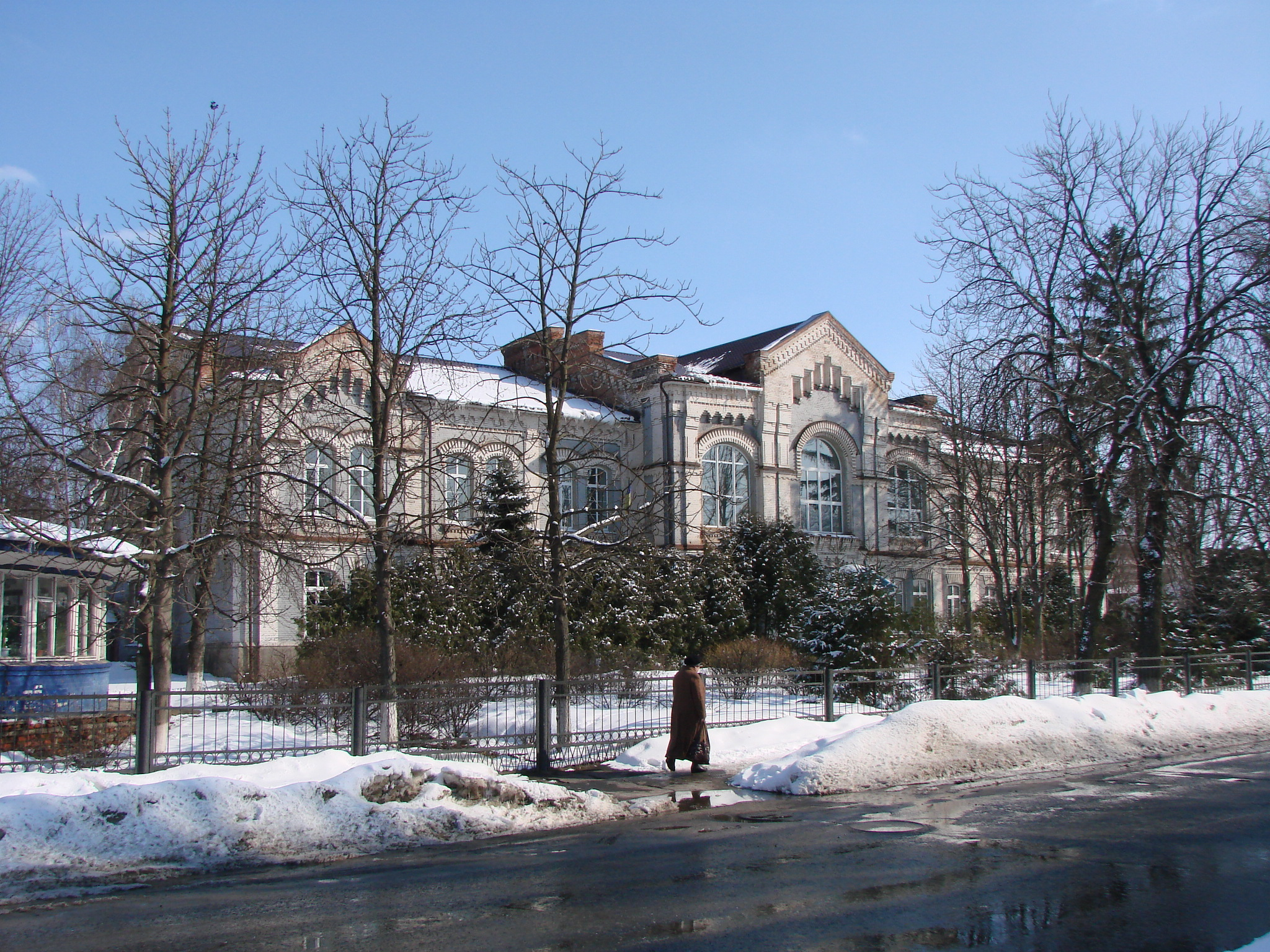
Former men's gymnasium

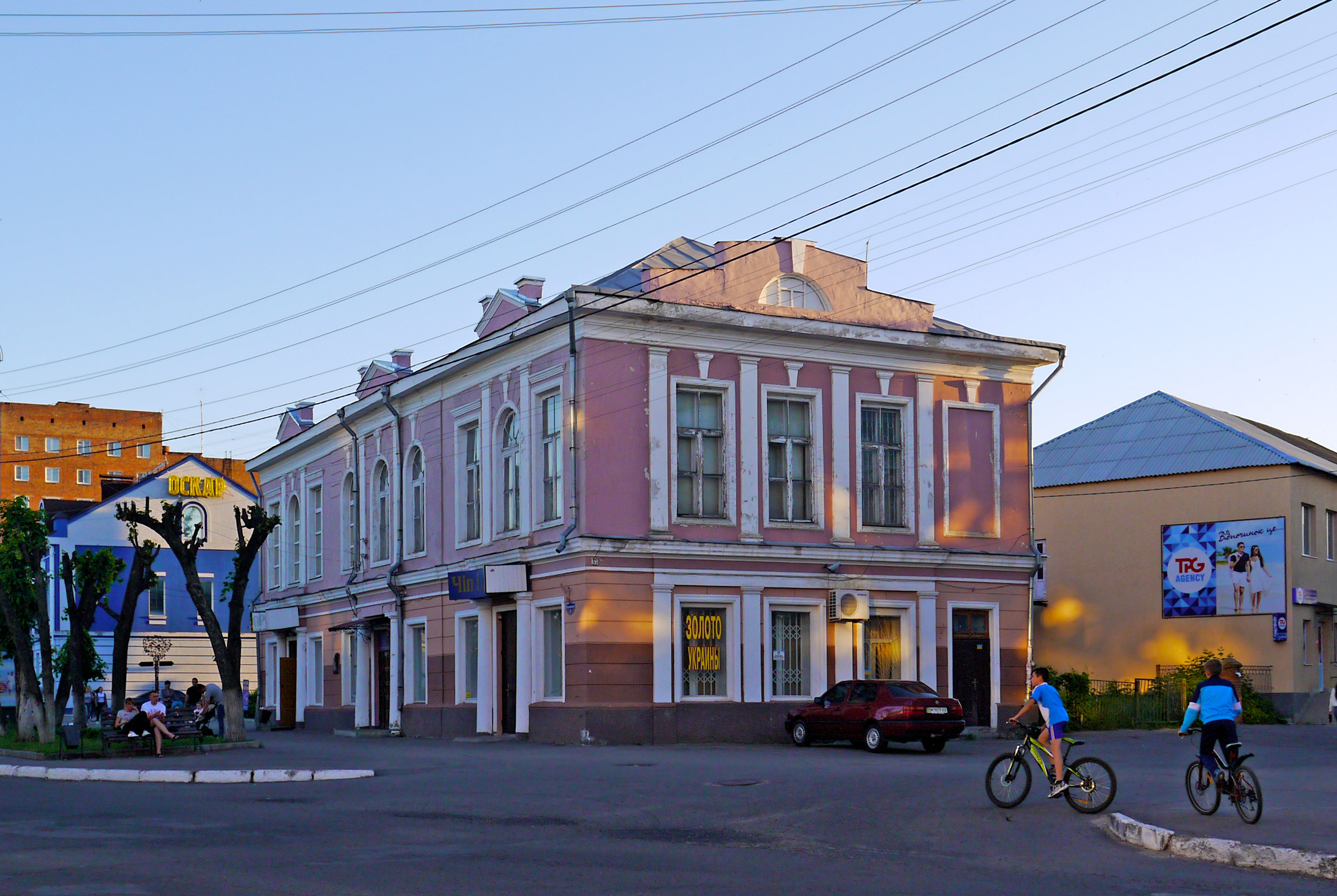
City museum

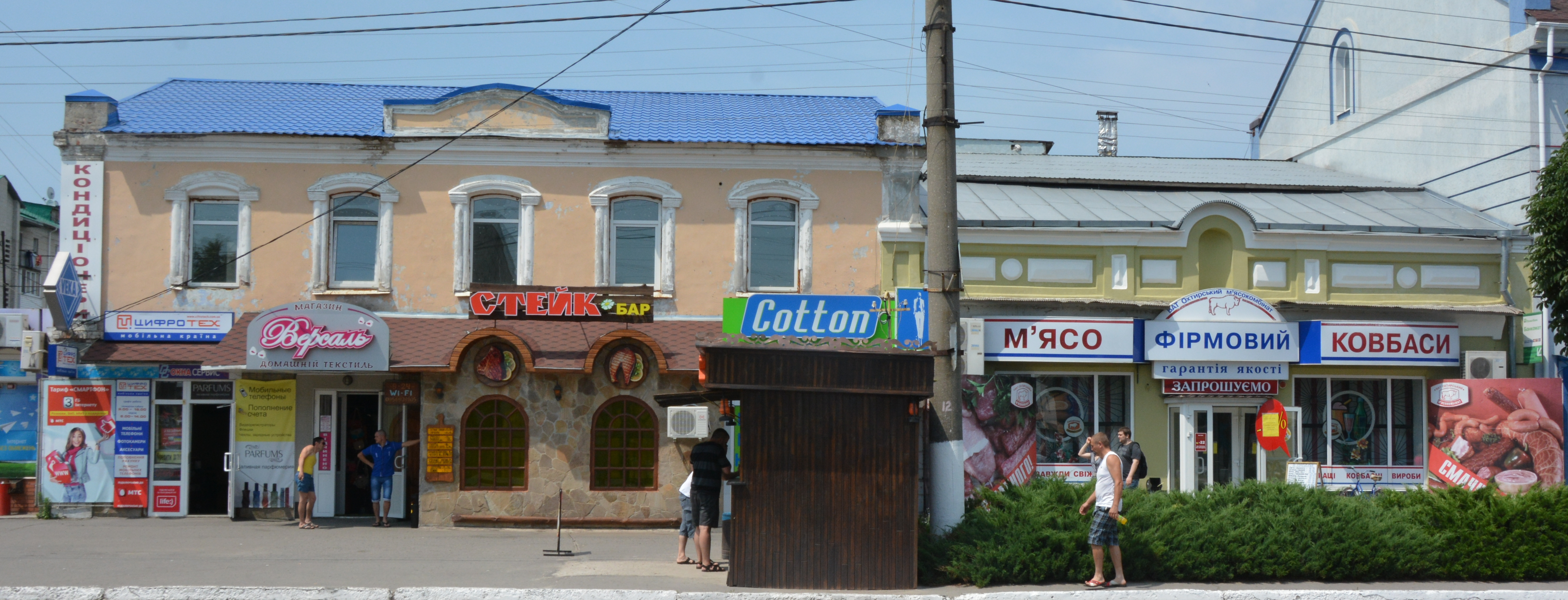
An old shopping street

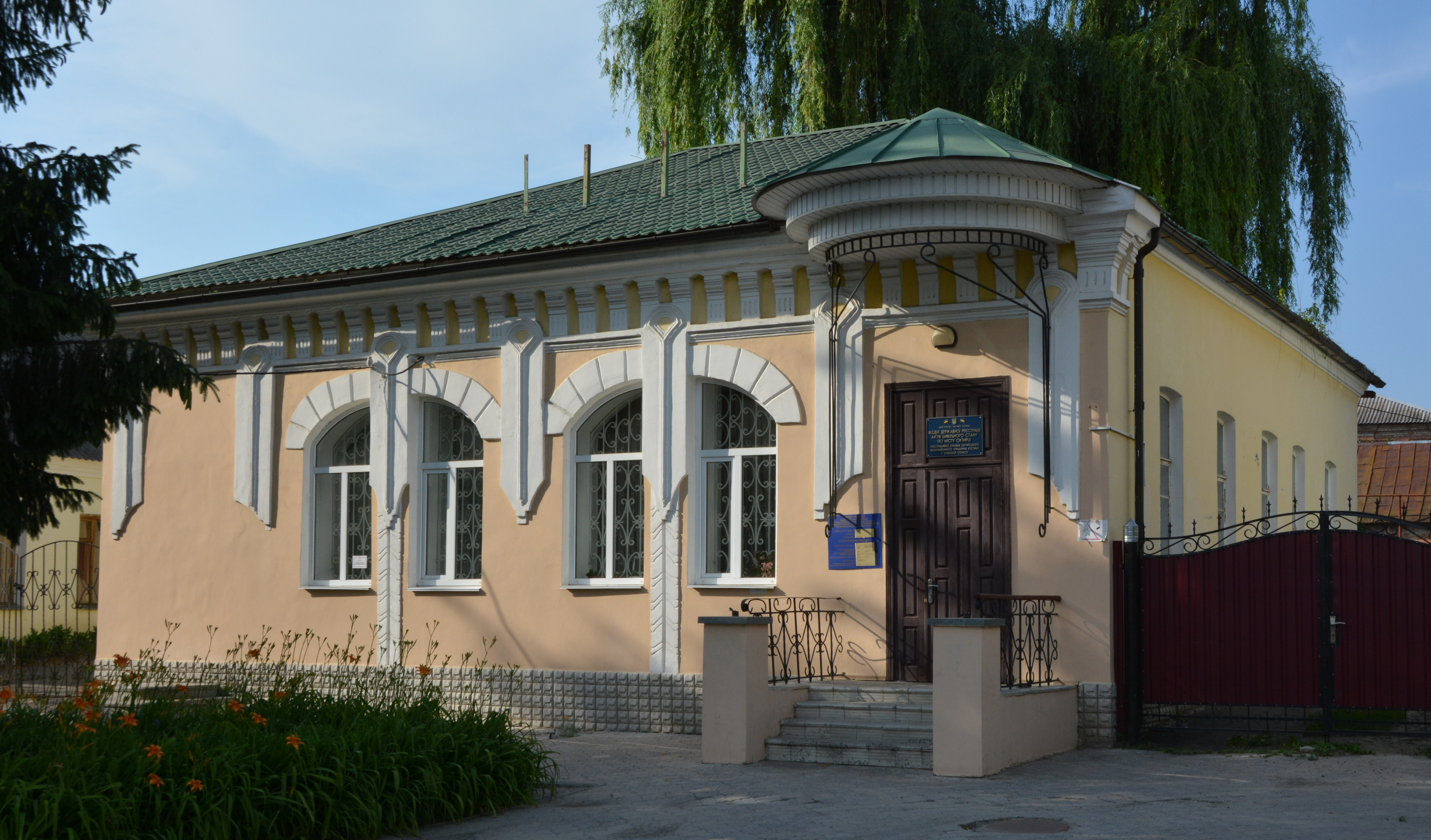
Old mansion

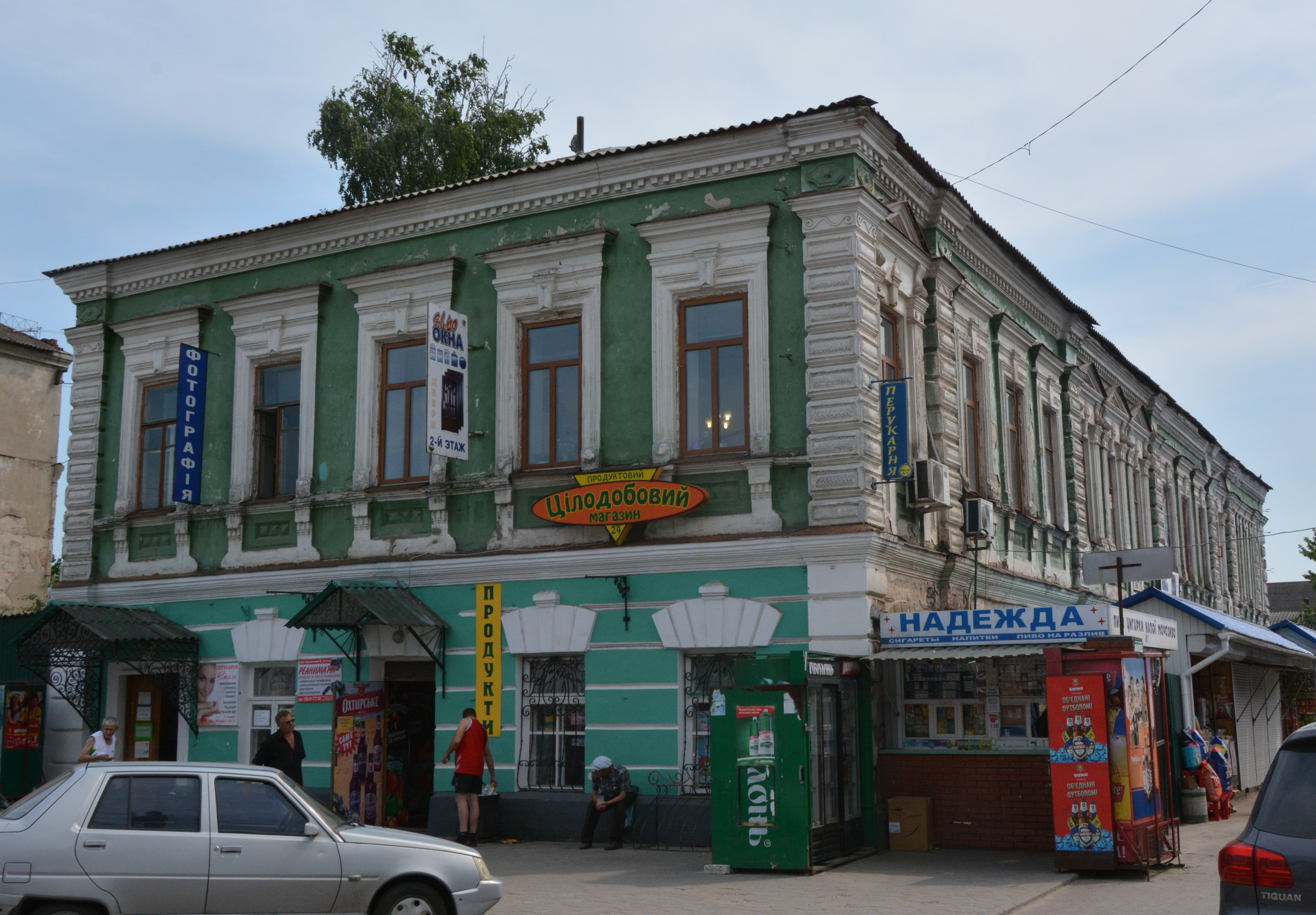
Trading house

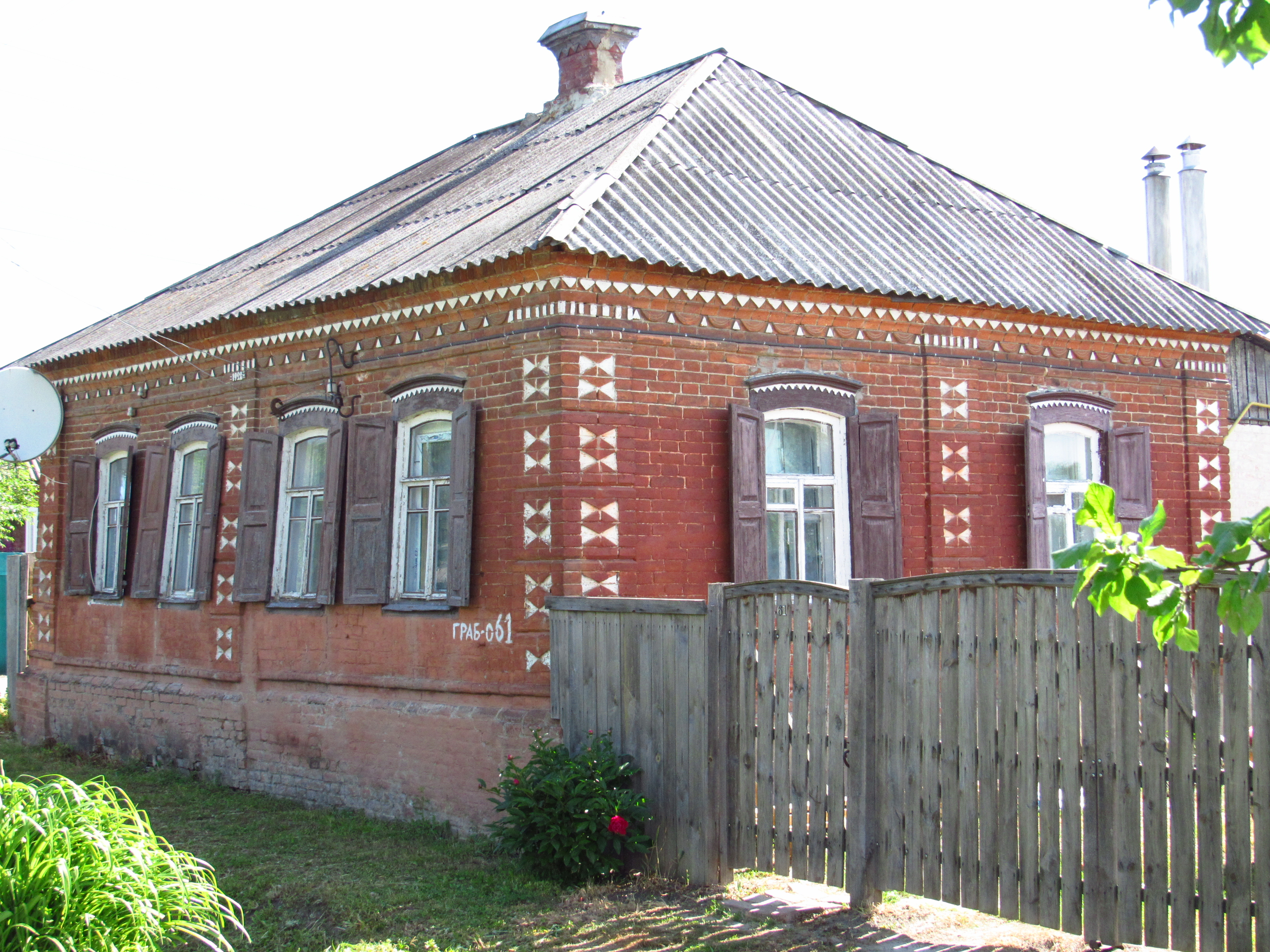
House of Ivan Bahrianyi
