= Okhtyrka Air Base =

Military aviation training air base in Ukraine

Okhtyrka
- IATA: none; ICAO: UKHA

Summary
- Airport type: Military
- Operator: Ukrainian Air Force
- Location: Okhtyrka
- Elevation AMSL: 489 ft / 149 m
- Coordinates: 50°18′0″N 035°1′0″E

Maps
- Shown within Sumy Oblast UKHA (Ukraine)
- Interactive map of Okhtyrka

Runways
Direction	Length		Surface
Direction	ft	m	Surface
	6,562	2,000	Concrete

Okhtyrka was a military aviation training air base in Ukraine located 8 km east of Okhtyrka city in Sumy Oblast. Operated by the Soviet Air Forces and then the Ukrainian Air Force, it was home to the 809th Aviation Training Regiment, flying 102 L-39C aircraft.

From 1961 - 1992 the regiment was part of the Kharkiv Higher Military Aviation School of Pilots.

The base ceased operations in 2004.
