= Okhtyrka Raion =

Subdivision of Sumy Oblast, Ukraine

Okhtyrka Raion Охтирський район
- Raion
- Flag Coat of arms

- Raion location in Sumy Oblast
- Coordinates: 50°17′36.8082″N 34°44′54.0054″E
- Country: Ukraine
- Oblast: Sumy Oblast
- Admin. center: Okhtyrka
- Subdivisions: 9 hromadas

Area
  - Total: 3,196.16 km^{2} (1,234.04 sq mi)

Population (2022)
  - Total: 120,107
  - Density: 37.5785/km^{2} (97.3280/sq mi)
- Time zone: UTC+2 (EET)
  - Summer (DST): UTC+3 (EEST)
- Website: http://rda.okhtyrka.net/

Okhtyrka Raion (Ukrainian: Охтирський район) is a raion in Sumy Oblast in Central Ukraine. The administrative center of the raion is the town of Okhtyrka. Population: 120,107 (2022 estimate).

On 18 July 2020, as part of the administrative reform of Ukraine, the number of raions of Sumy Oblast was reduced to five, and the area of Okhtyrka Raion was significantly expanded. The January 2020 estimate of the raion population was 25,234 (2020 est.).

== History ==
Previously, the territory of the district was part of the Okhtyrsky, Velykopysarovsky, Trostyanetsky districts and the city of regional subordination Okhtyrka.

In March 2024, after deadly Russian attacks, more than 180 people were evacuated from Velyka Pysarivka hromada in Okhtyrka Raion.

== Geographic characteristics ==
The area of the district is 3196.16 km^{2}. Okhtyrsky Raion is located on the slopes of the Central Russian Upland. The highest point is 202 m above sea level.

The climate is moderately continental. Winter is cool, summer is not hot. The average temperature in July is +19 °C, in January -7.5 °C. The maximum precipitation falls in the summer in the form of rain. The average annual amount is from 650 to 700 mm, changing from west to east.

Vorskla, left tributary of the Dnipro flow through the Okhtyrsky district. The river in the floodplain has many oxbow lakes and artificial lakes.

Okhtyrsky Raion has reserves of silt, sapropel, peat, sulfur.

Okhtyrsky district is part of the Dnipro-Donetsk oil and gas region and has several oil and natural gas deposits.

Okhtyrsky district is located in the forest-steppe natural zone. Among the trees in the forests, oaks, lindens, and maples dominate. Typical large mammals are elk, roe deer, wild boar, squirrels, beavers, hares and wolves. The most common soils in the area are typical black earths, gray, meadow, and meadow-bog soils.

=== Environmental protection activities ===
In the Okhtyrsky district, the Hetman National Nature Park, the Khukhryansky, Bakyrivsky, and Klimentivsky nature reserves of national importance are located along the Vorskla River. Animals and plants listed in the Red Book of Ukraine that are found in the territory of the Okhtyrsky district: common crane, river otter, ermine, Ukrainian brook lamprey, bombus muscorum, stag beetle, swallowtail butterfly, gladiolus tenuis, two-leaved lyubka and May palmate.

== Hromadas of the raion ==
There are 185 populated places and 2 cities in Okhtyrka Raion. The raion includes 9 hromadas (municipalities): Okhtyrka and Trostyanets urban hromadas, Velyka Pysarivka, Kyrykivka, Chupakhivka settlement hromadas, and Boromlia, Hrun, Komyshi, Chernechchyna rural hromadas.

== Bibliography ==
- Національний атлас України/НАН України, Інститут географії, Державна служба геодезії, картографії та кадастру; голов. ред. Л. Г. Руденко; голова ред. кол.Б.Є. Патон. — К.: ДНВП «Картографія», 2007. — 435 с. — 5 тис.прим. — ISBN 978-966-475-067-4.
- Географічна енциклопедія України : [у 3 т.] / редкол.: О. М. Маринич (відповід. ред.) та ін. — К., 1989—1993. — 33 000 екз. — ISBN 5-88500-015-8.
