= Hetman National Nature Park =

National park in Ukraine

- Ukrainian: Гетьманський національний природний парк
- IUCN category II (national park)
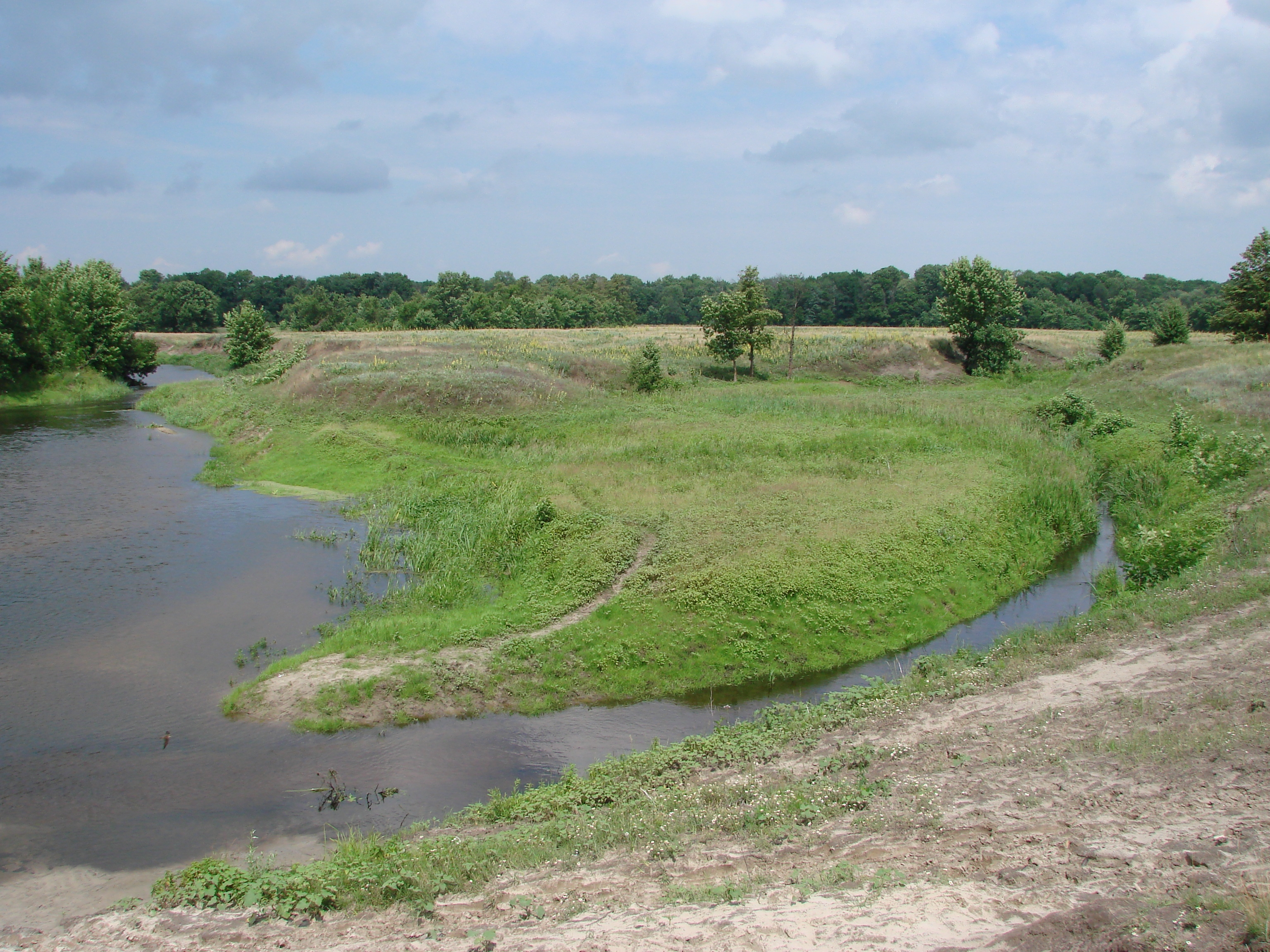
- Hetman National Nature Park

- Location within Ukraine
- Location: Okhtyrka Raion, Sumy Oblast,
- Nearest city: Trostianets
- Coordinates: 50.4867°N 34.9831°E
- Area: 23,360 hectares (57,724 acres; 234 km^{2}; 90 sq mi)
- Established: 2009
- Governing body: Ministry of Ecology and Natural Resources (Ukraine)
- Website: http://getmanski.info/index.php/ukr/

The Hetman National Nature Park (Ukrainian: Гетьманський національний природний парк) is a national park of Ukraine that follows floodplains and terraces of the right bank of the Vorskla River. The park is administrative in Okhtyrka Raion of Sumy Oblast.

The park was created on April 27, 2009 with the aim of preserving, reproducing and rationally using the typical and unique natural complexes of the Left Bank forest-steppe, which have important nature conservation, scientific, aesthetic, recreational and health-improving significance, in accordance with Article 53 of the Law of Ukraine "On the Nature Reserve Fund of Ukraine".

== Topography ==
The park begins at the border with Russia as the Vorskla River runs west and south, and follows the river for all 122 km of its length through Sumy Oblast. There are some short breaks between sectors for roads or built-up villages. Their terrain is mostly flat, with some hills and ravines.

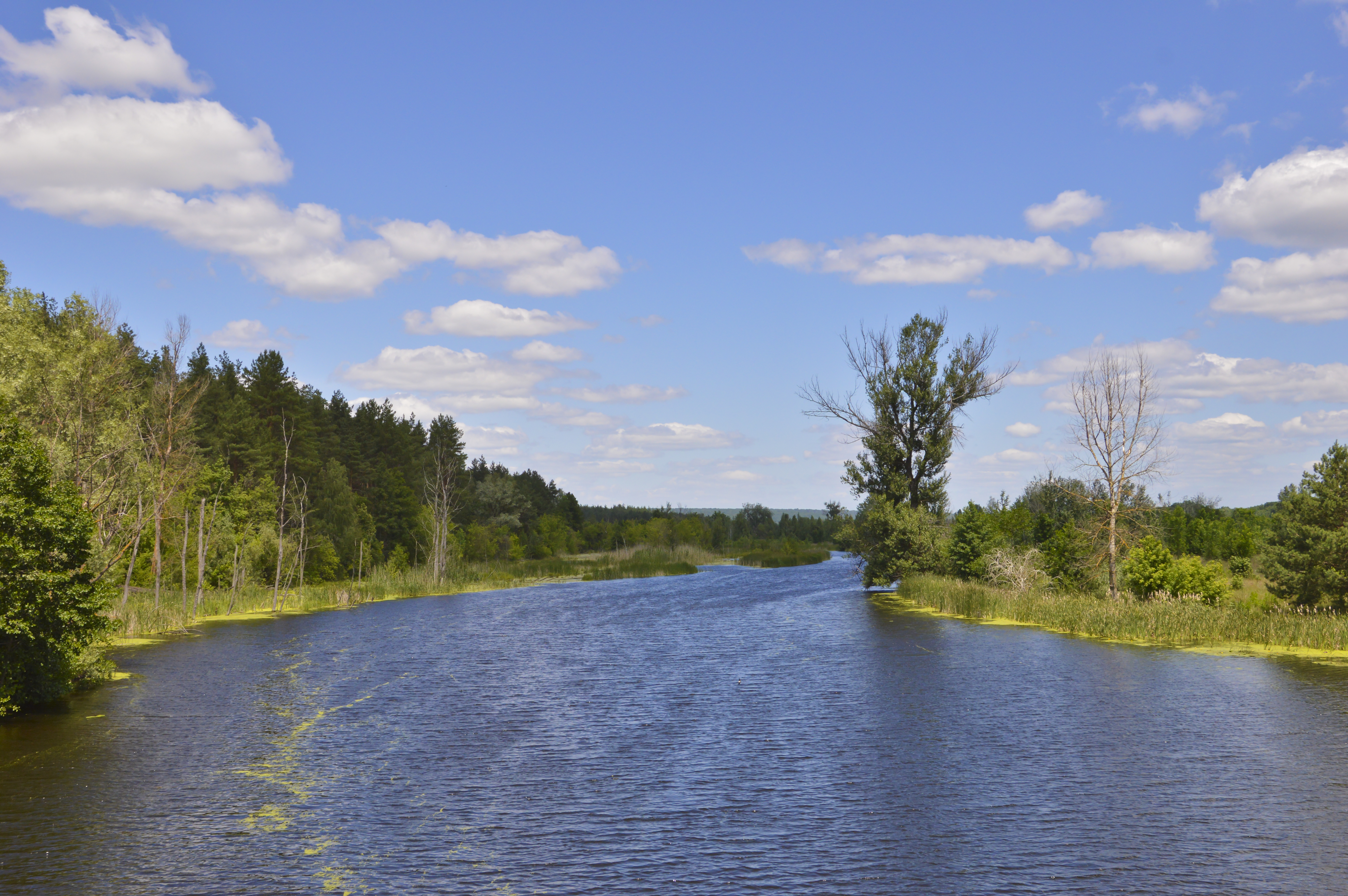
Hetmansky NNP

== Climate and ecoregion ==
The climate of the Hetman area is Humid continental climate, warm summer (Köppen climate classification (Dfb)). This climate is characterized by large swings in temperature, both diurnally and seasonally, with mild summers and cold, snowy winters.

Hetman is in the East European forest steppe ecoregion, a band of patchy forests and grasslands that stretches from the middle of Ukraine to the Ural Mountains.

== Flora, fauna, and funga ==
The river valley supports floodplain and terrace wetlands and forest-steppe floral communities. The forest trees are mostly oak, linden, ash, aspen, willow, cherry, birchbark, pine, and birch. Great diversity of the mushroom kingdom. On the territory of the park, it is known about the growth of numerous species of macromycetes - microscopic mushrooms. Some of them, such as coral-like heritium and dog's mutin, are listed in the Red Book of Ukraine.

== Public use ==
There are hiking trails and guided ecological excursion trails available, and kayaking routes on the river. The park supports educational programs for local school groups, and public education campaigns related to nature preservation.

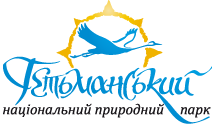
Park logo

== See also ==
- National Parks of Ukraine
