= Platon Voronko =

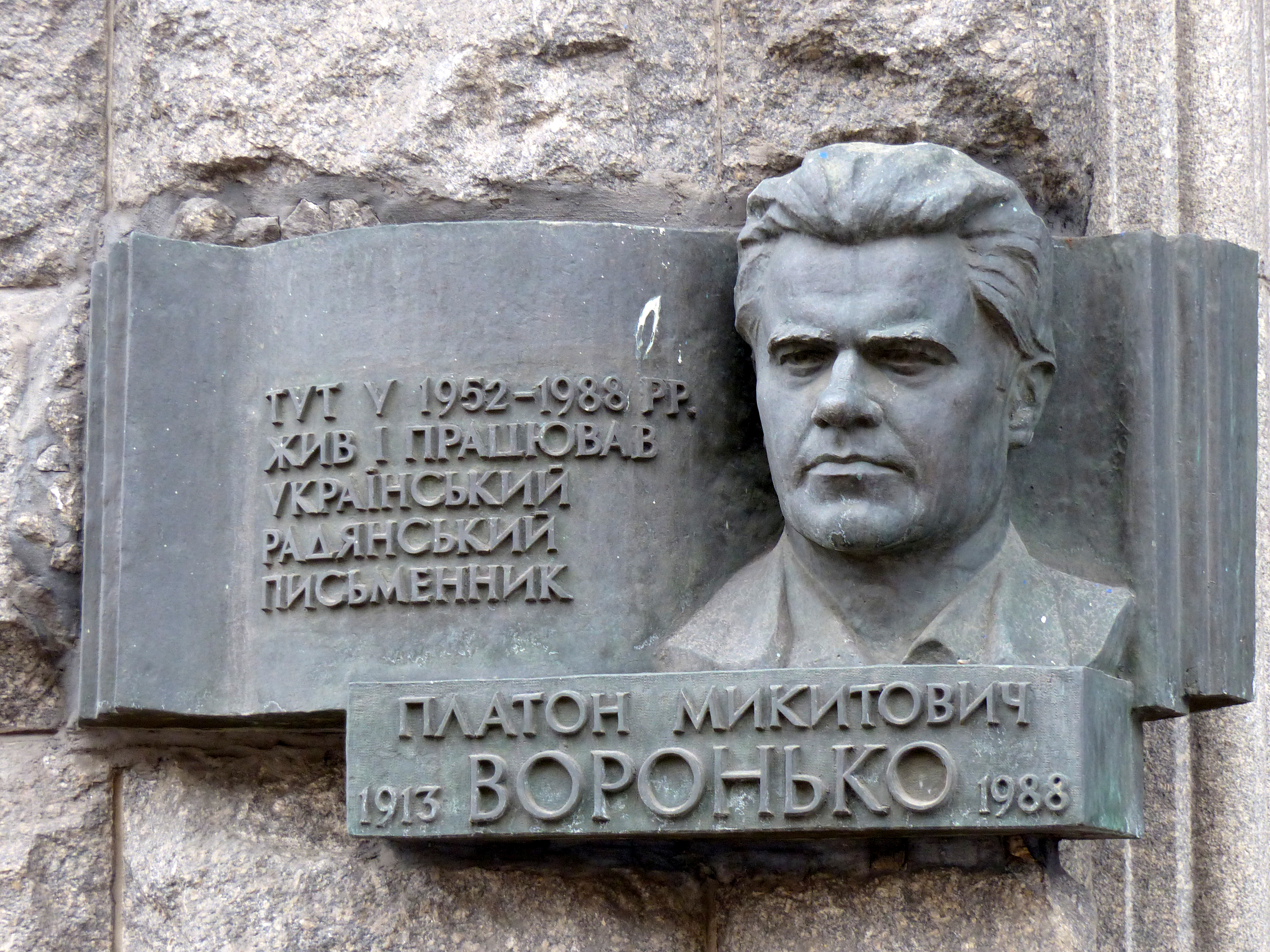
Memorial plaque to Voronko in Kyiv

Platon Mykytovych Voronko (Ukrainian: Платон Микитович Воронько; 1 December (O.S. 18 November) 1913, Chernechchyna, Akhtyrsky Uyezd, Kharkov Governorate – 10 August 1988, Kyiv, Ukrainian SSR) was a Ukrainian poet and member of the Soviet partisan movement. In Ukraine he is best known for his children's poems.

== Early life and education ==
He studied in the Kharkiv Transport Institut.

== Career ==
In his works, Voronko frequently used the instruments of folk poetry combined with official Soviet patriotism and optimism. uages.
