= List of people from Poltava =

This list contains notable people who were born or lived in Poltava, Ukraine.

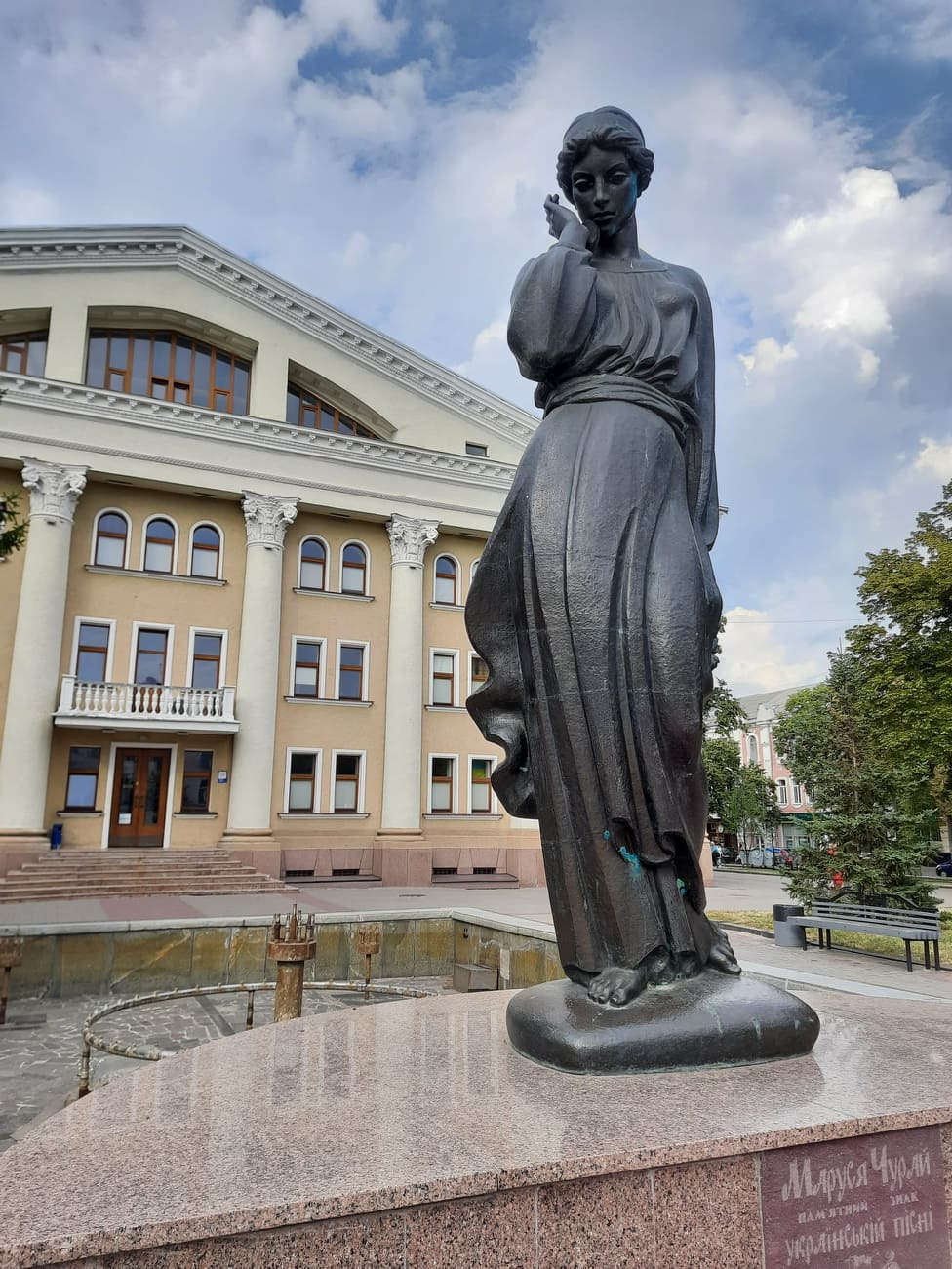
Marusia Churai Memorial, 2021

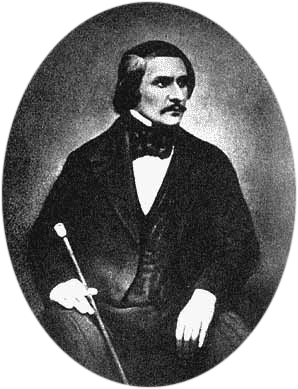
Nikolai Gogol, 1845

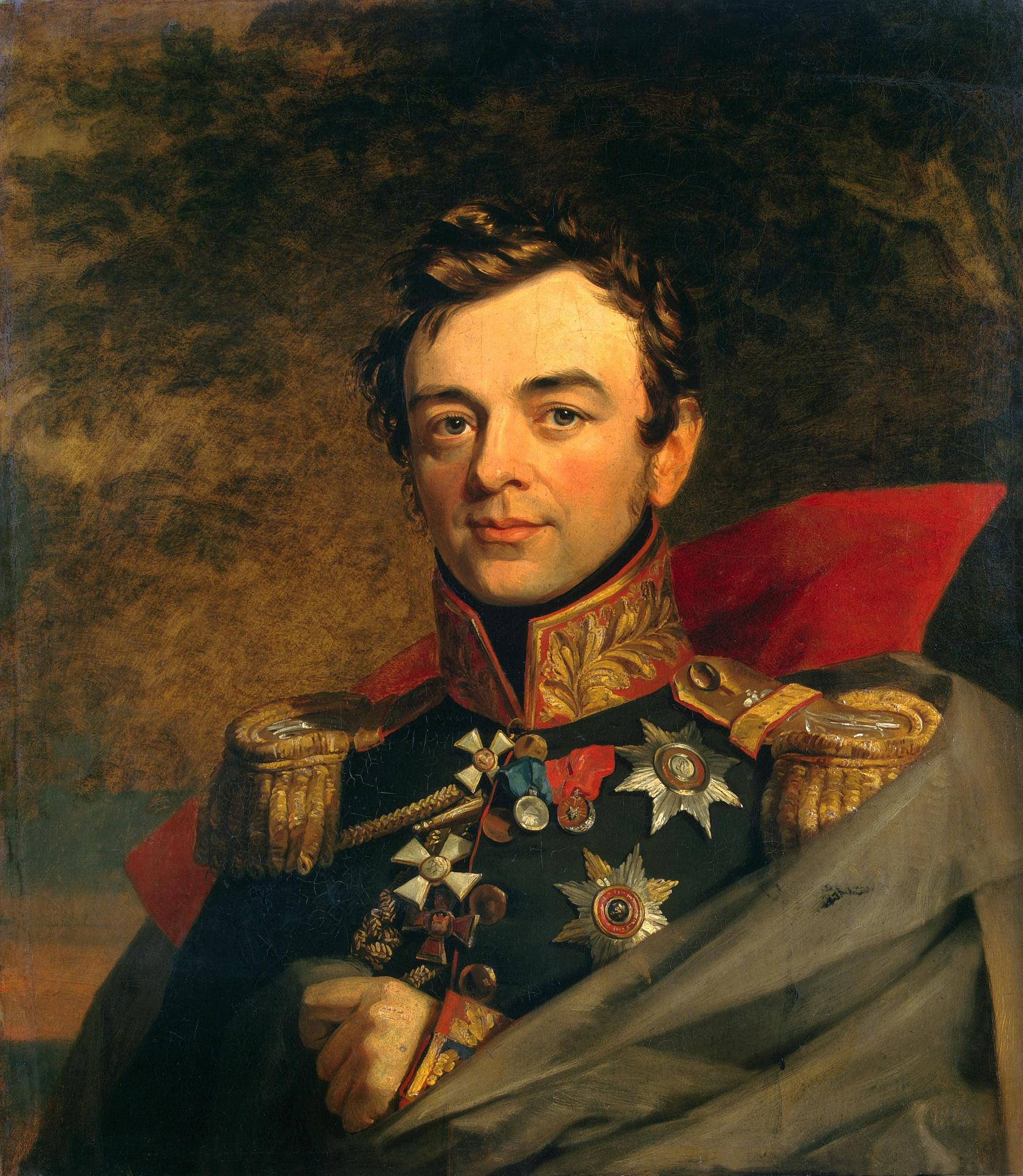
Ivan Paskevich, 1823

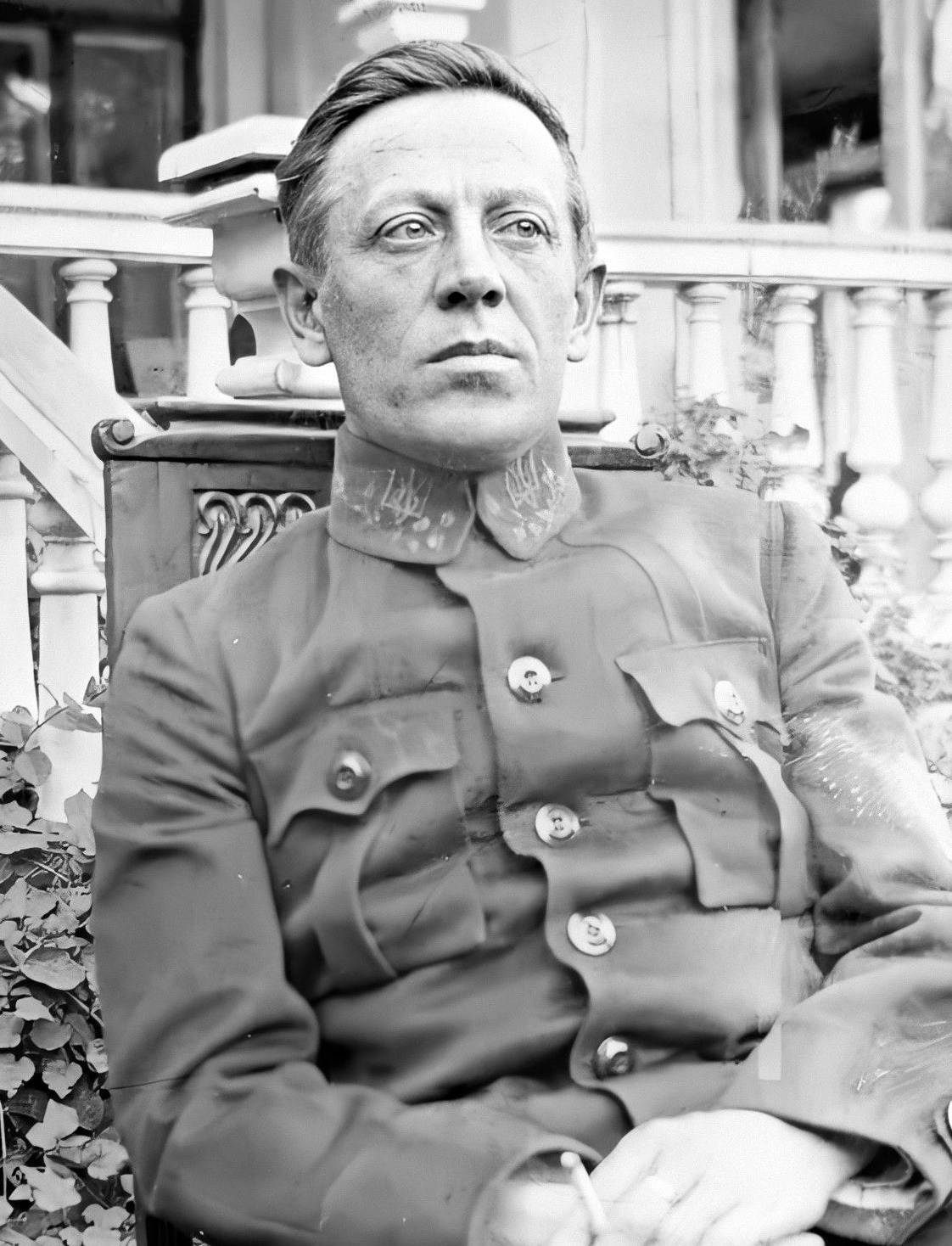
Symon Petliura, 1920s

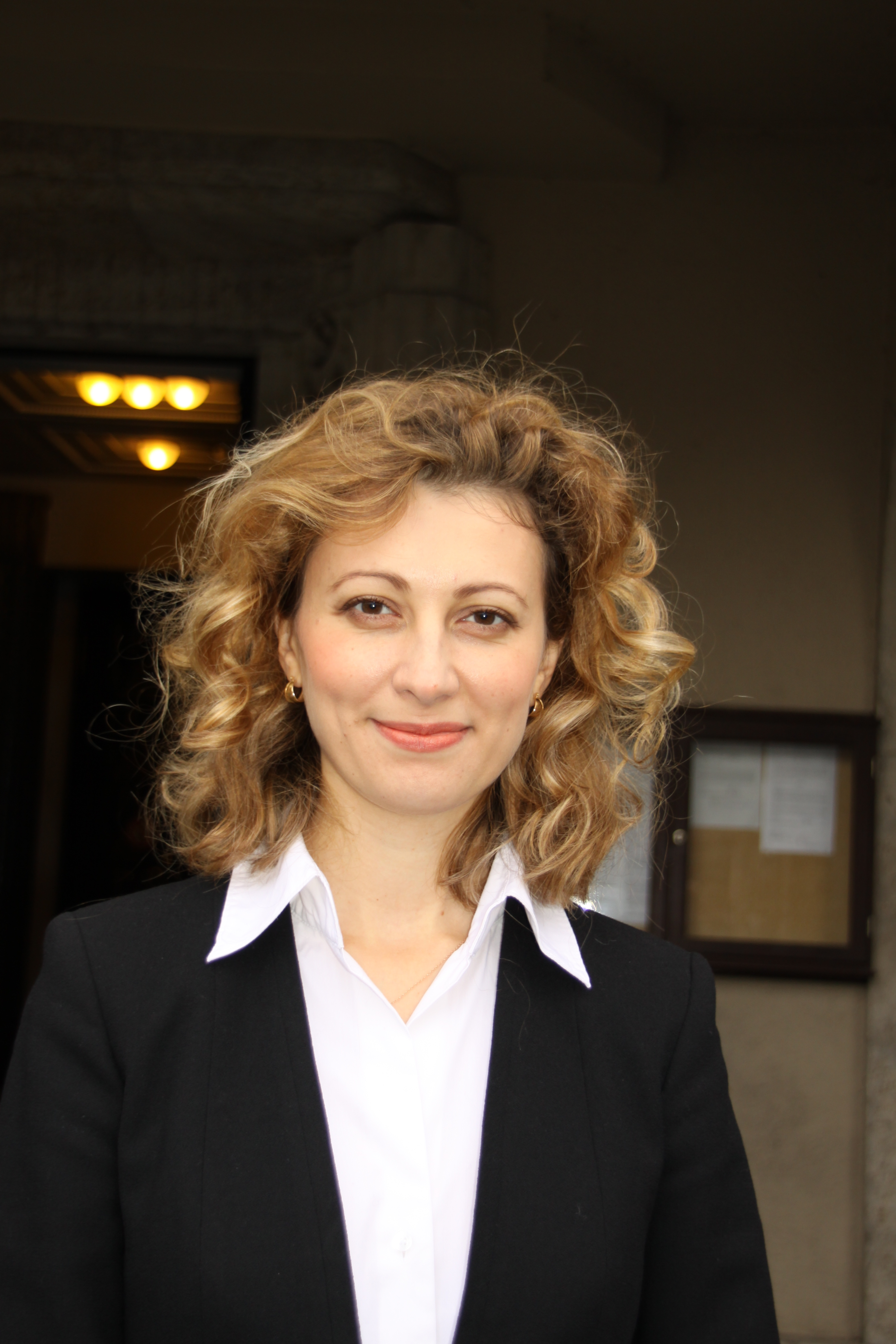
Alina Treiger, 2010

- Marie Bashkirtseff (1858–1884) Parisian painter and diarist.
- Yitzhak Ben-Zvi (1884–1963) historian, longest-serving President of Israel from 1952 to 1963.
- Hanka Bielicka (1915–2006) a Polish singer and actress, known by the name Hanna
- Oleksandr Bilash (1931–2003) composer of lyric songs, ballads, operas, operettas and oratorios
- Sofya Bogomolets (1856–1892) a Russian revolutionary and political prisoner.
- Boris Brasol (1885–1963), lawyer and literary critic and a White Russian immigrant to the United States.
- Moura Budberg (1892–1974), a Russian adventuress and suspected double agent of OGPU & MI6.
- Semion Braude (1911–2003) was a Soviet and Ukrainian physicist and radio astronomer
- Nat Carr (1886–1944) an American character actor of the silent and early talking picture eras.
- Gregori Chmara (1878–1970) a stage and film actor whose career spanned six decades.
- Marusia Churai (1625–1653) a semi-mythical Ukrainian Baroque composer, poet, and singer.
- Andriy Danylko (born 1973) stage name Verka Serduchka; a Ukrainian comedian, actor, and singer.
- Sam Dreben (1878–1925), a highly decorated soldier in the US Army and a mercenary
- Vladimir Gajdarov (1893–1978) a Russian film actor and star of Russian and German silent cinema.
- Yuliy Ganf (1898–1973) a graphic artist, caricaturist, illustrator and poster designer.
- Nikolai Gogol (1809–1852), a novelist, short story writer and playwright.
- Grigory Gricher (1893–1945), Soviet Ukrainian film director and screenwriter of Jewish descent
- Alexander Gurwitsch (1874–1954) biologist and medical scientist; originated Morphogenetic field theory
- Oksana Ivanenko (1906–1997) – Ukrainian children's writer and translator
- Vladimir Ivashko (1932–1994), politician, acting General Secretary of the Communist Party of the Soviet Union
- Philip Jaffe (1895–1980) a left-wing American businessman, editor and author.
- Ernst Jedliczka (1855–1904) a Russian-German pianist, piano pedagogue, and music critic.
- Mykola Karpov (1929–2003), Ukrainian playwright.
- Dmitri Kessel (1902–1995), photojournalist, Life magazine 1944–1972 and war correspondent
- Vera Kholodnaya (1893–1919) an actress of the early Imperial Russian cinema.
- Yuri Kondratyuk (1897–1942), astronautics and spaceflight pioneer; foresaw reaching the Moon
- Ivan Kotliarevsky (1769–1838) a Ukrainian writer, poet and playwright and social activist
- Anatoly Lunacharsky (1875–1933) Russian Marxist revolutionary; Bolshevik Soviet people's Commissar
- Anton Makarenko (1888–1939), educator, social worker and writer and top educational theorist
- Yuri Levitin (1912–1993) a Soviet Russian composer of classical music.
- Mykola Lysenko (1842–1912) composer, pianist, conductor; founder first Ukrainian classical music school
- Patriarch Mstyslav (1898–1993), Ukrainian Orthodox Church hierarch
- Matvei Muranov (1873–1959) a Ukrainian Bolshevik revolutionary, Soviet politician and statesman.
- Yelyzaveta Myloradovych (1832–1890), Ukrainian philanthropist and community activist.
- Panas Myrny (1849–1920) a Ukrainian prose writer and playwright
- Jensen Noen (born 1987) a Los Angeles-based filmmaker, cinematographer and writer.
- Oleksiy Onyschenko (born 1933) a philosopher, academic and culture theorist
- Mikhail Ostrogradsky (1801–1862), a Ukrainian mathematician, mechanic and physicist
- Olena Pchilka (1849–1930), a Ukrainian publisher, writer, ethnographer and civil activist.
- Ivan Paskevich (1782–1856), Ukrainian military leader in Imperial Russian service.
- Symon Petliura (1879–1926) a Ukrainian politician, journalist and military leader of Ukraine's struggle for independence following the fall of the Russian Empire in 1917.
- Vladimir Picheta (1878–1947), a Belarusian historian, first rector of the Belarusian State University
- Zhanna Prokhorenko (1940–2011) a Soviet and Russian actress
- Sasha Putrya (1977–1989) Ukrainian artist, died aged 11 from leukemia.
- Svitlana Pyrkalo (born 1976) a London-based writer, journalist and former BBC radio producer
- Boris Schwanwitsch (1889–1957) a Russian entomologist who specialised in Lepidoptera.
- Moshe Zvi Segal (1904–1985), rabbi and activist in Israeli organizations, including Etzel and Lechi.
- Bert Shefter (1902–1999) a film composer who worked primarily in America.
- Avraham Shlonsky (1900–1973), Israeli poet and editor
- Hryhorii Skovoroda (1722–1794) a Ukrainian poet, philosopher and composer
- Ivan Steshenko (1873–1918), a Ukrainian civic and political activist, writer and Govt. minister.
- Maria Tarnowska (1877–1949), femme fatale, famously convicted of murder in Venice in 1910.
- Elias Tcherikower (1881–1943), a Jewish historian of Judaism and the Jewish people.
- Alina Treiger (born 1979) the first female rabbi to be ordained in Germany since WWII.
- Yelena Ubiyvovk (1918–1942) a partisan and leader of a Komsomol cell during WWII.
- Paisius Velichkovsky (1722–1794), Eastern Orthodox monk and theologian, promoted staretsdom
- Nikolai Yaroshenko (1846–1898) a Ukrainian painter of portraits, genre paintings and drawings.
- Ya'akov Zerubavel (1886–1967) co-founder of Poale Zion and Yiddish advocate
- Mikhail Zoshchenko (1894-1958) a Soviet writer and satirist, who according to some sources was born in Poltava but later claimed to have been born in St Petersburg.

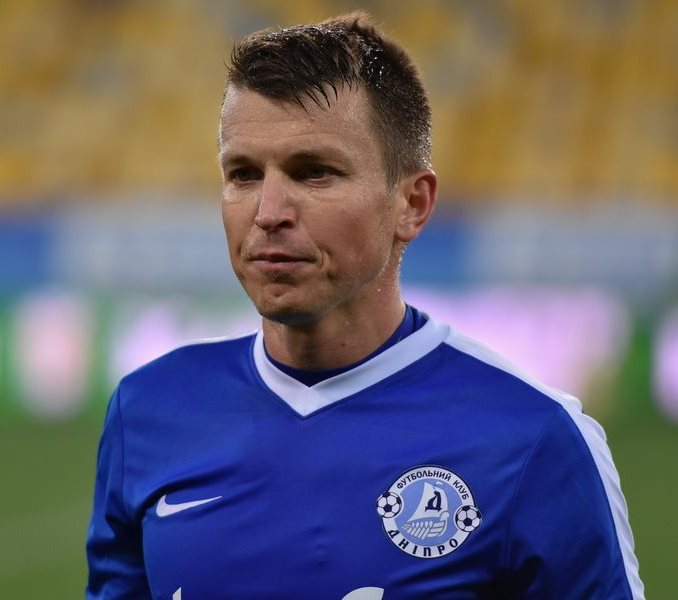
Ruslan Rotan, 2016

- Leonid Bartenyev (1933–2021) a 100 metre team silver medallist at the 1956 and 1960 Summer Olympics
- Viktor Buhaievskyi (1939–2009), Soviet and Ukrainian professional footballer
- Sergei Diyev (born 1958) a Russian football manager and former player with over 600 club caps
- Serhiy Konovalov (born 1972) a football coach and former footballer with 270 club caps and 22 for Ukraine
- Oleksandr Melaschenko (born 1978) a football striker with over 320 club caps and 16 for Ukraine
- Ruslan Rotan (born 1981) a former professional footballer with 382 club caps and 100 for Ukraine; now manager of the Ukraine national under-21 football team
- Ivan Shariy (born 1957) is a former Soviet and Ukrainian footballer with over 500 club caps
