= Holy Cross Exaltation Monastery, Poltava =

Eastern Orthodox convent in Poltava, Ukraine

Holy Cross Exaltation Monastery
- Хрестовоздвиженський монастир
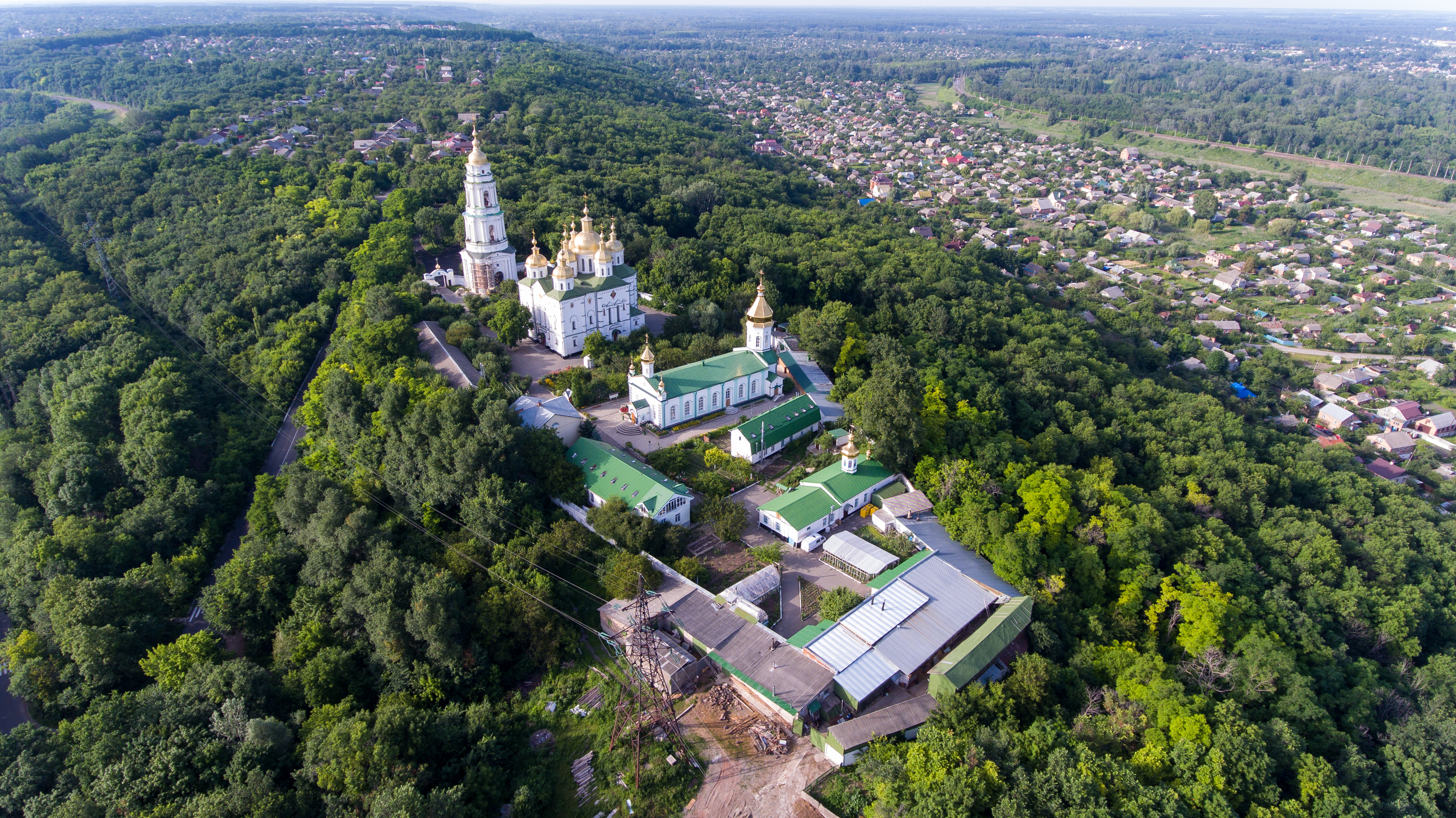

- Location within Poltava Oblast Location within Ukraine
- 49°35′44″N 34°34′37″E
- Location: Poltava
- Country: Ukraine
- Denomination: Ukrainian Orthodox Church (Moscow Patriarchate)
- Website: krestpoltava-mon.church.ua

Architecture
- Style: Ukrainian Baroque

Immovable Monument of National Significance of Ukraine
- Official name: Здвиженський монастир та дзвіниця (Exaltation Monastery and its bell tower)
- Type: Architecture
- Reference no.: 160044

Holy Cross Exaltation Monastery
- Хрестовоздвиженський монастир
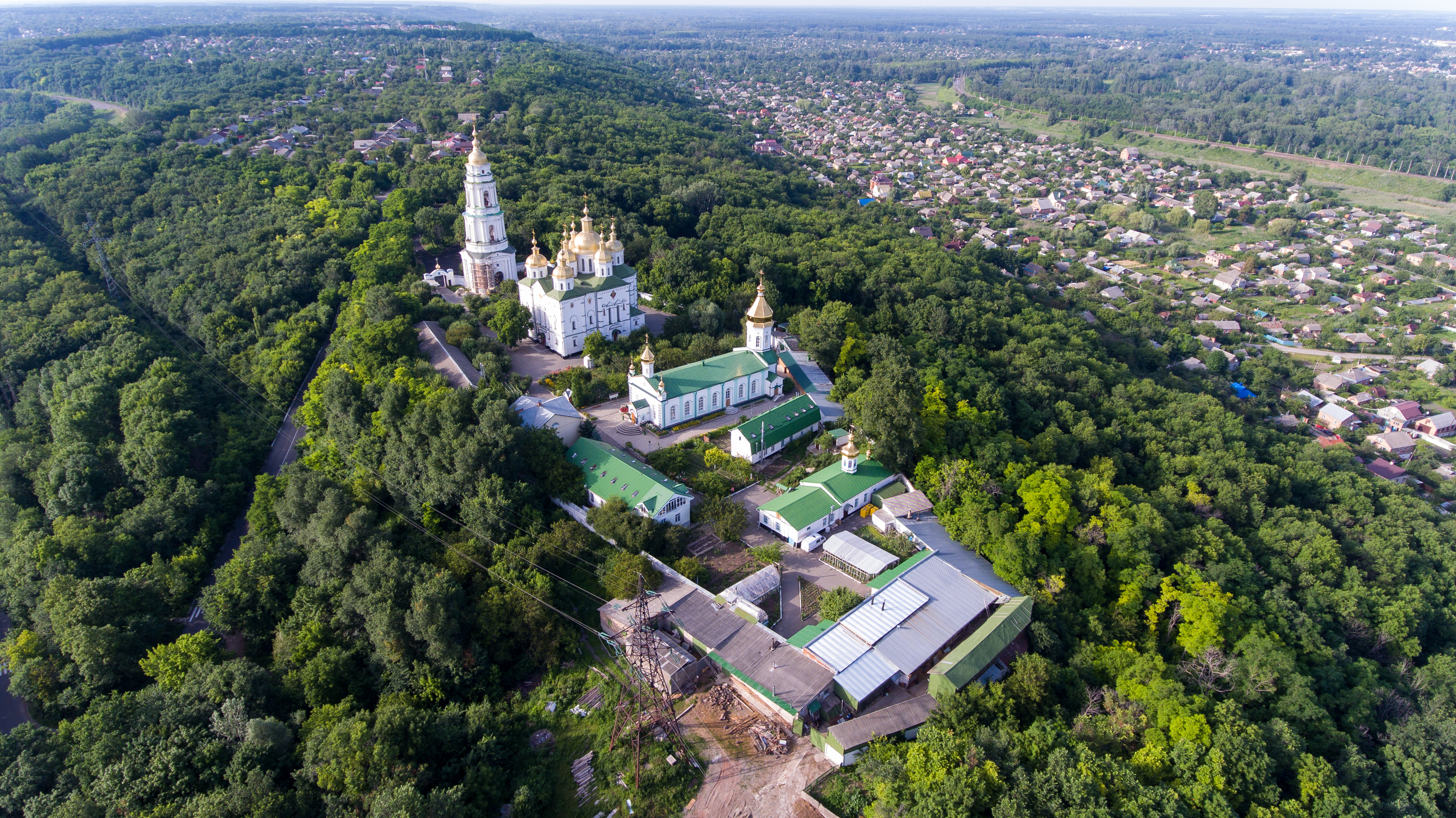

- Location within Poltava Oblast Location within Ukraine

Monastery information
- Denomination: Ukrainian Orthodox Church (Moscow Patriarchate)
- Established: 1650
- Disestablished: c. 1941–1945
- Reestablished: 1999

Architecture
- Style: Ukrainian Baroque

Site
- Location: Poltava
- Country: Ukraine
- Coordinates: 49°35′44″N 34°34′37″E
- Website: krestpoltava-mon.church.ua

The Women's Monastery of the Exaltation of the Holy Cross (Ukrainian: Хрестовоздвиженський жіночий монастир, romanized: Khrestovozdvyzhenskyi zhinochyi monastyr) is a convent of the Ukrainian Orthodox Church (Moscow Patriarchate) located in Poltava, Ukraine. The nunnery is located on Monastyrska Hill in the Poltava city neighborhood known as Chervonyi Shlyakh.

== History ==
The Holy Cross Exaltation Monastery was founded in 1650 by the Mhar Monastery hegumen, Kalistrat, with the blessing of the Metropolitan of Kyiv Sylvester Kosiv. The Mhar Monastery, located west, was founded only a few decades earlier. The construction of the initial, wooden Poltava monastery complex was financed by Poltava Regiment Colonel (Polkovnyk) Martyn Pushkar and other Poltava city residents. In 1689 Hetman Ivan Samoylovych funded the construction of the masonry-based Holy Cross Exaltation Cathedral, which was built in a similar way as the cathedral of the Mhar Savior-Transfiguration Monastery. Following the fall of Samoylovych, the construction was supervised by Hetman Ivan Mazepa and Poltava Regiment Colonel Ivan Iskra.

In 1693, during the Ruin, the monastery was burned down by soldiers of the Crimean Khanate. In the spring of 1709, during the siege of Poltava, the monastery was taken by Swedish forces and from its bastions the Swedes fired upon the Poltava fortress. It later served as a base for Swedish forces during the Battle of Poltava amidst the Great Northern War.

Several foreign leaders have visited the monastery. King Charles XII of Sweden visited the monastery during the Great Northern War, as did Peter the Great. The former monarch even lived in the monastery for a short period of time, and later Romanov emperors also regularly attended services.

Following the Battle of Poltava, the construction of the cathedral was finished by the Hetmanate General Judge Vasily Kochubey and his son, the Poltava Regiment Colonel Vasyl Kochubey. In 1756, the cathedral was finally consecrated. In 1750, just south of the cathedral, a masonry refectory was built with the Saint Trinity Church. In 1770, the building of the monastery superior and fraternal monastic cells was built. The fraternal cells served as the monastery boundaries from the city's side. In 1786, a masonry bell tower was built. Being the highest building, it is 47 m (154 ft) tall. In 1881 and 1887, the monastery was surrounded by masonry walls. In 1887, the Refectory Church of Simeon the Godreceiver was built. In 1889, the masonry monastic compound with a hospital was built.

From 1776, the monastery was a cathedral for archiereus of the Sloviansk and Kherson eparchy (diocese). The newly established eparchy covered most of the territory of Zaporizhian Sich, which was converted as the Novorossiya Governorate following the annexation. Eugenios Voulgaris became the first bishop of the newly established eparchy (established in 1775) and he made the monastery his primary residence from 1776 to 1781. He was later succeeded by his acquaintance Nikephoros Theotokis. Already in 1797, the monastery became part of the Chernihiv eparchy, and from 1884 it served as a residency of the Poltava eparchy vicars. In 1786, the former Sloviansk and Kherson eparchy was transformed into the Yekaterinoslav and Taurida eparchy and was headed by various Muscovite archiereus.

Eugenios Voulgaris established the Poltava Sloviansk Seminary at the monastery. Among notable students, there were Vasili Gogol-Yanovsky (father of Nikolay Gogol), Nikolay Gnedich, Ivan Kotliarevskyi, Athanasios Psalidas, others. Later, the institution became the Yaketerinoslav Theological Seminary.

Taras Shevchenko painted the monastery in 1845.

Following the Soviet occupation of the Ukrainian–Soviet War, in 1923 the monastery was closed down, and in 1933, most of the monastic buildings were destroyed by the Soviet regime. The monastery was converted into the NKVD Children Labor Colony.

During World War II in 1942, it was revived as a nunnery. On 3 December 1941, the Nazi Germany Reichskanzler, Adolf Hitler, paid a visit to the monastery. During the Soviet liberation of Poltava, the monastery was destroyed once again, and the main cathedral lay in ruins until 1956.

In 1960, the nunnery was closed down. The compound was transferred to the Poltava Psychiatric Hospital, which created a boarding school for children with intellectual disability. The monastic community was transferred to Saint Nicholas Convent in Lebedyn, Cherkasy Oblast. In 1990, it was reconstituted again as a nunnery of the newly established Ukrainian Orthodox Church (Moscow Patriarchate). During 1950-1953, some conservation measures were applied to the surviving buildings. Restoration works were carried out from 1981 to 2000.

It was restored in 1999.

The monastery is designed in a Ukrainian Baroque style. It is included on the State Register of Immovable Monuments of Ukraine, and draws hundreds of visitors yearly.

== Architectural compound complex ==
The following buildings of the monastery are registered as Ukrainian protected structures.

- Exaltation cathedral (1699—1709)
- Bell tower (1786)
- Brothers' compound (1886)
- Building of the Monastery Superior (1889)
- Refectory Church (1886)
- Economic compound (19th century)

Restored structures:

- St. Trinity Church (1999)

== Gallery ==
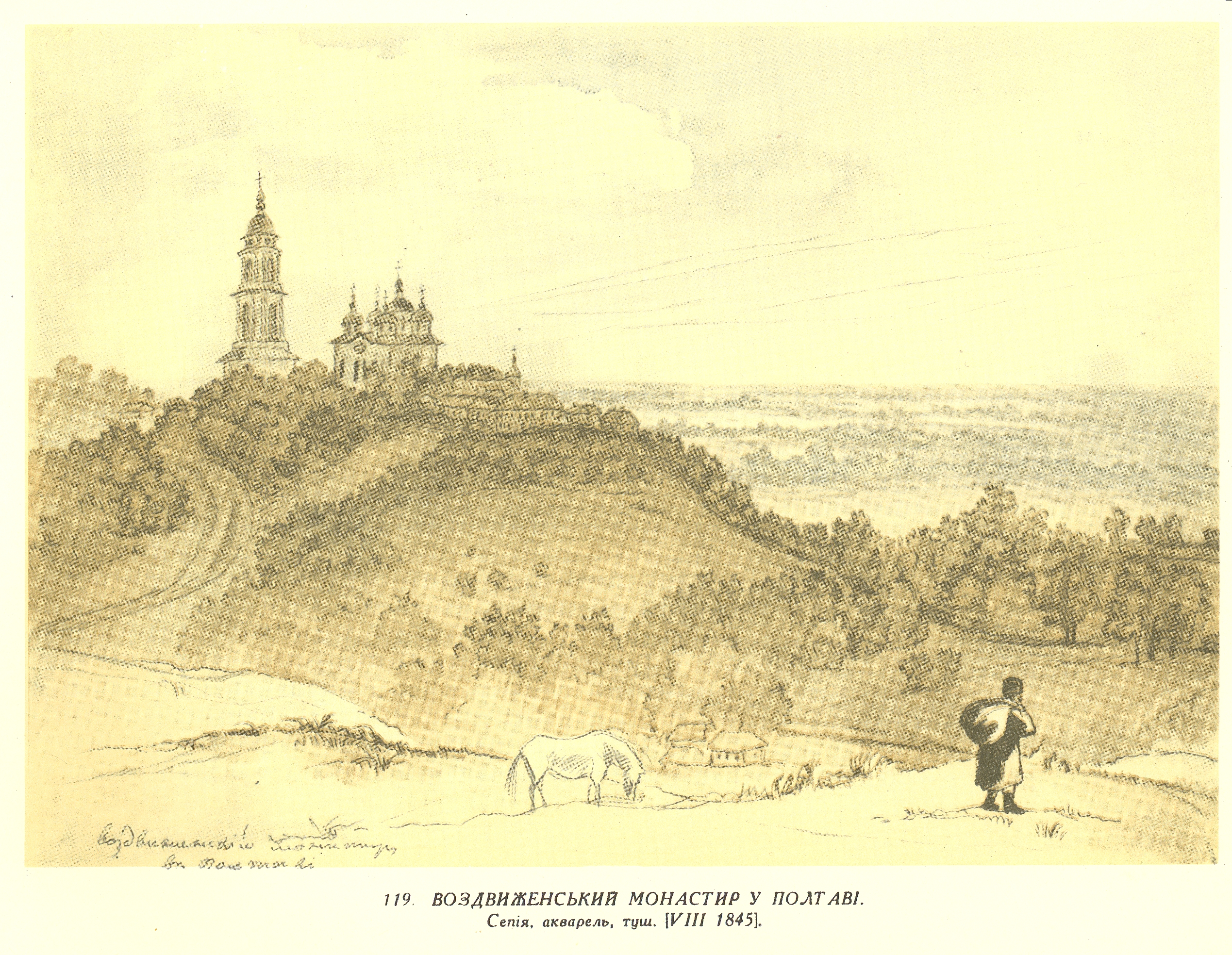
Painting of the monastery by Shevchenko

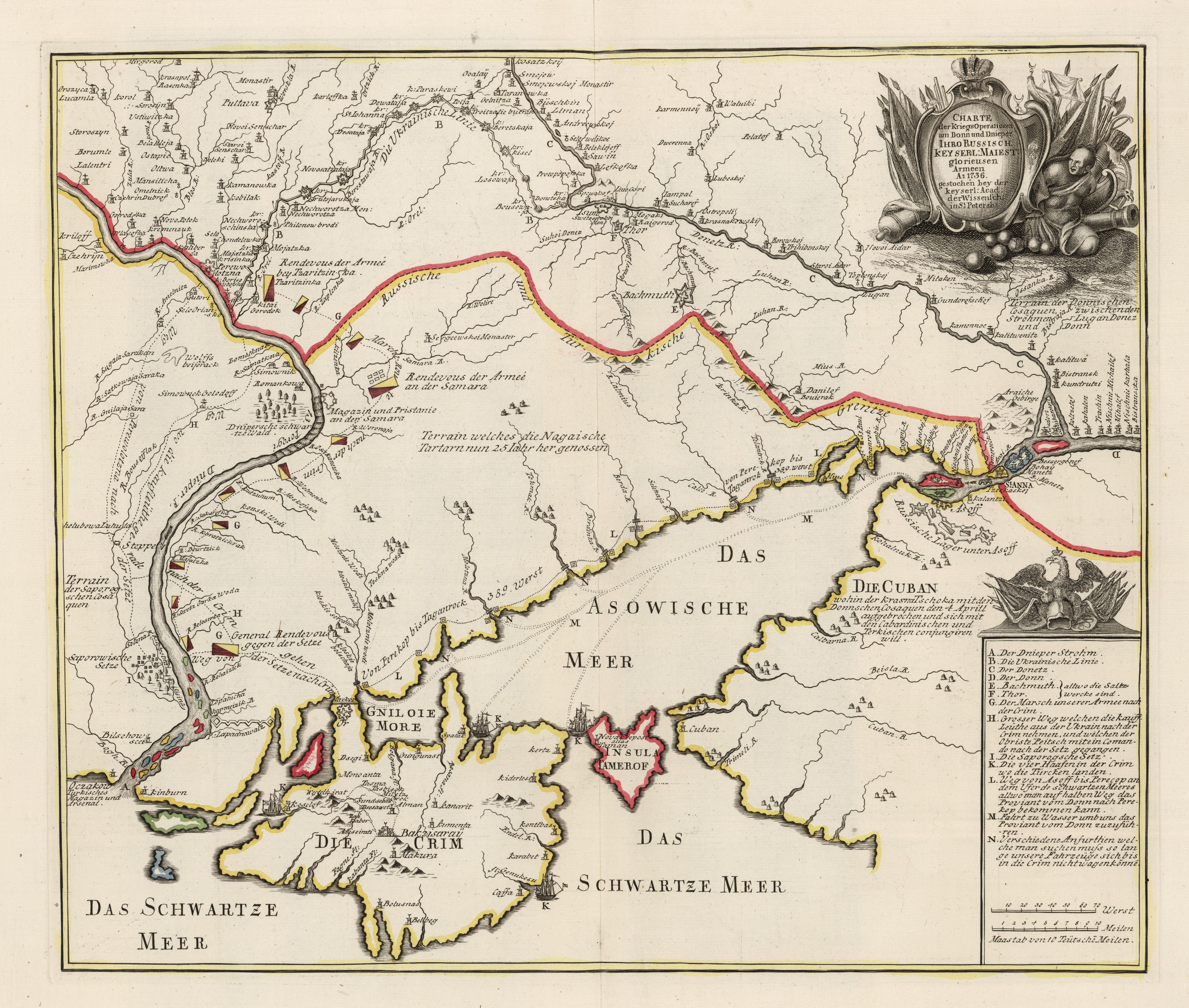
The monastery is just north of Pultava (Poltava) and marked as "Monastir".

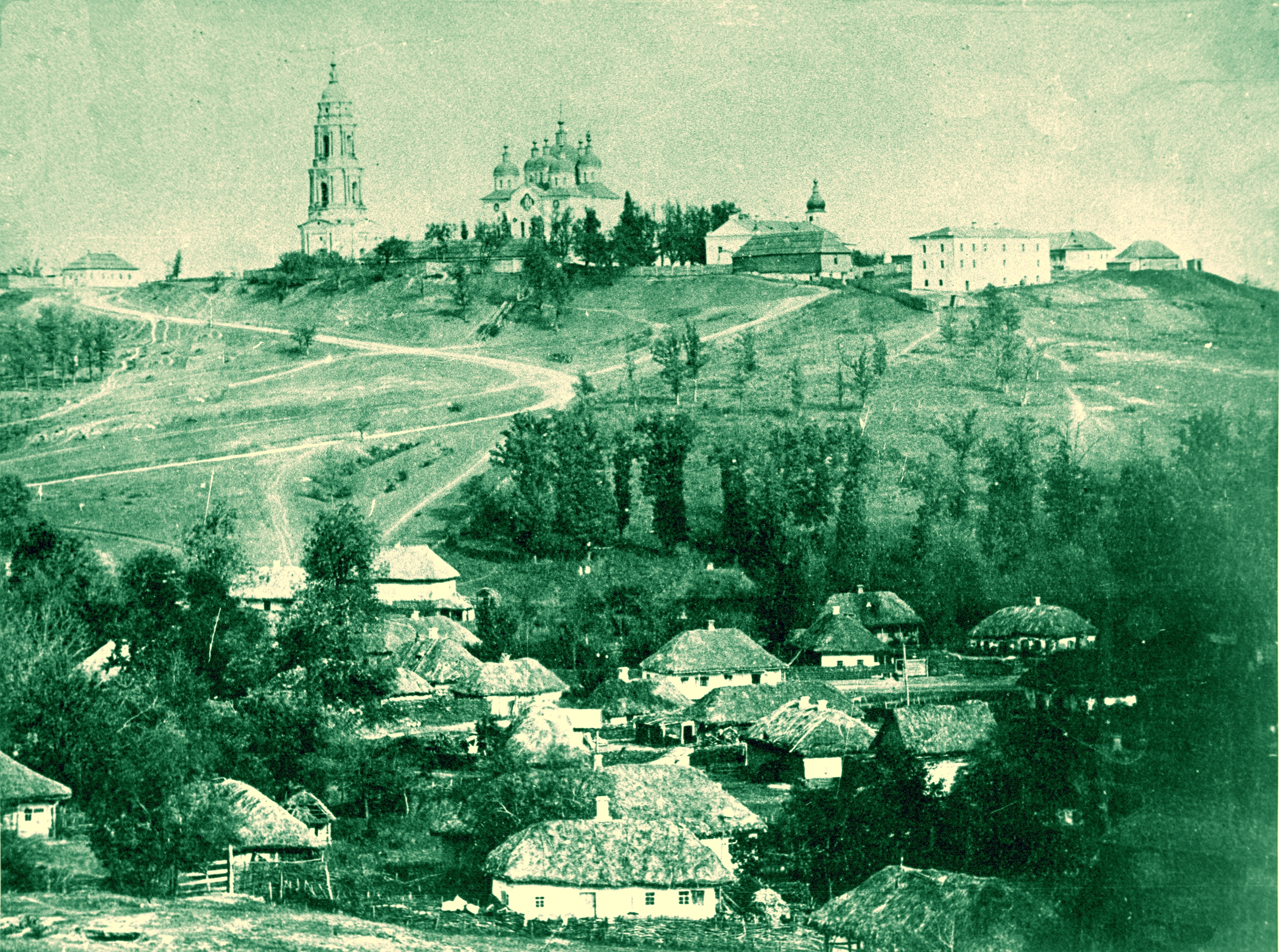
1900 photo of the monastery from the foot of the hill

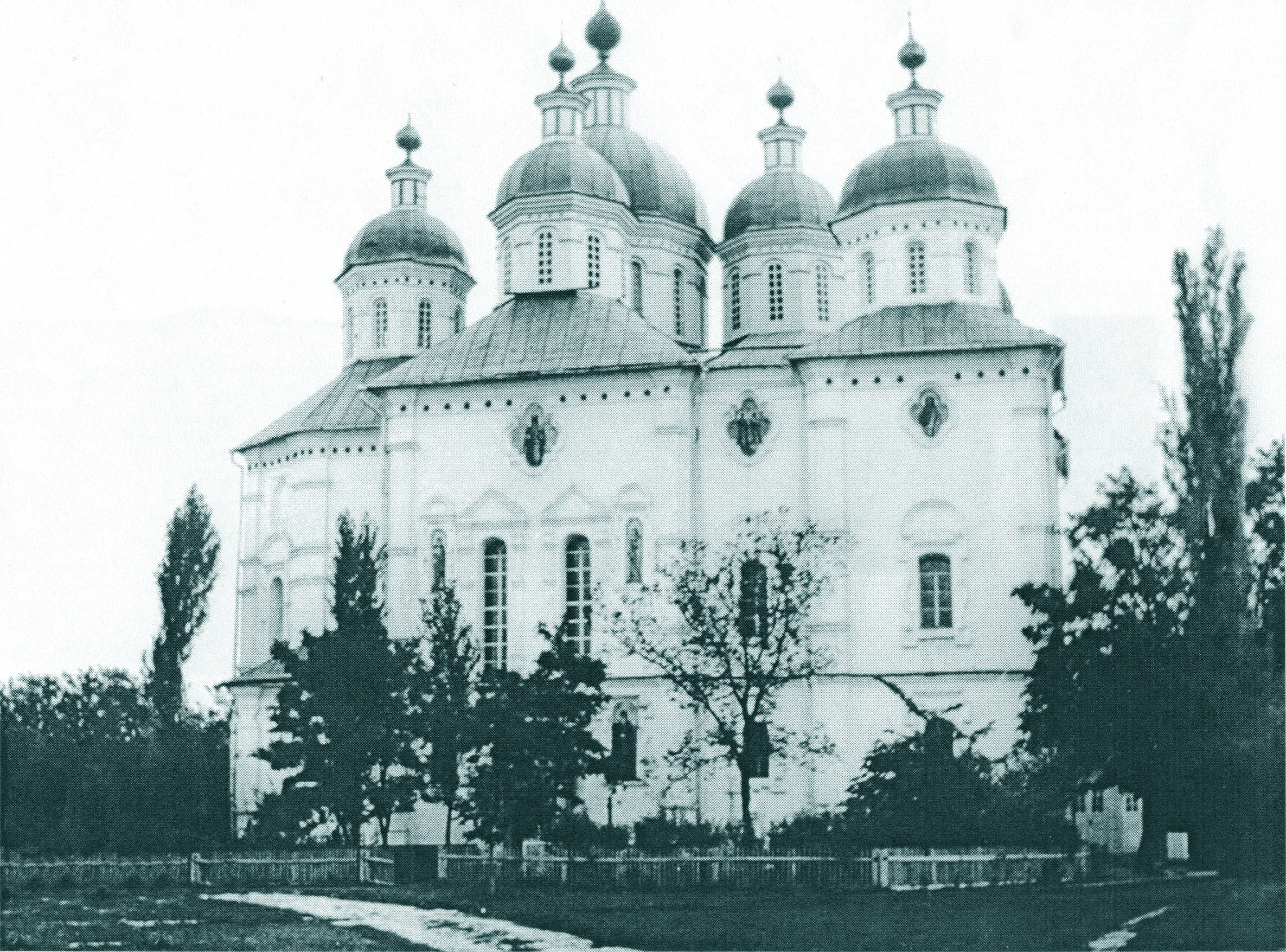
1900 photo of the cathedral

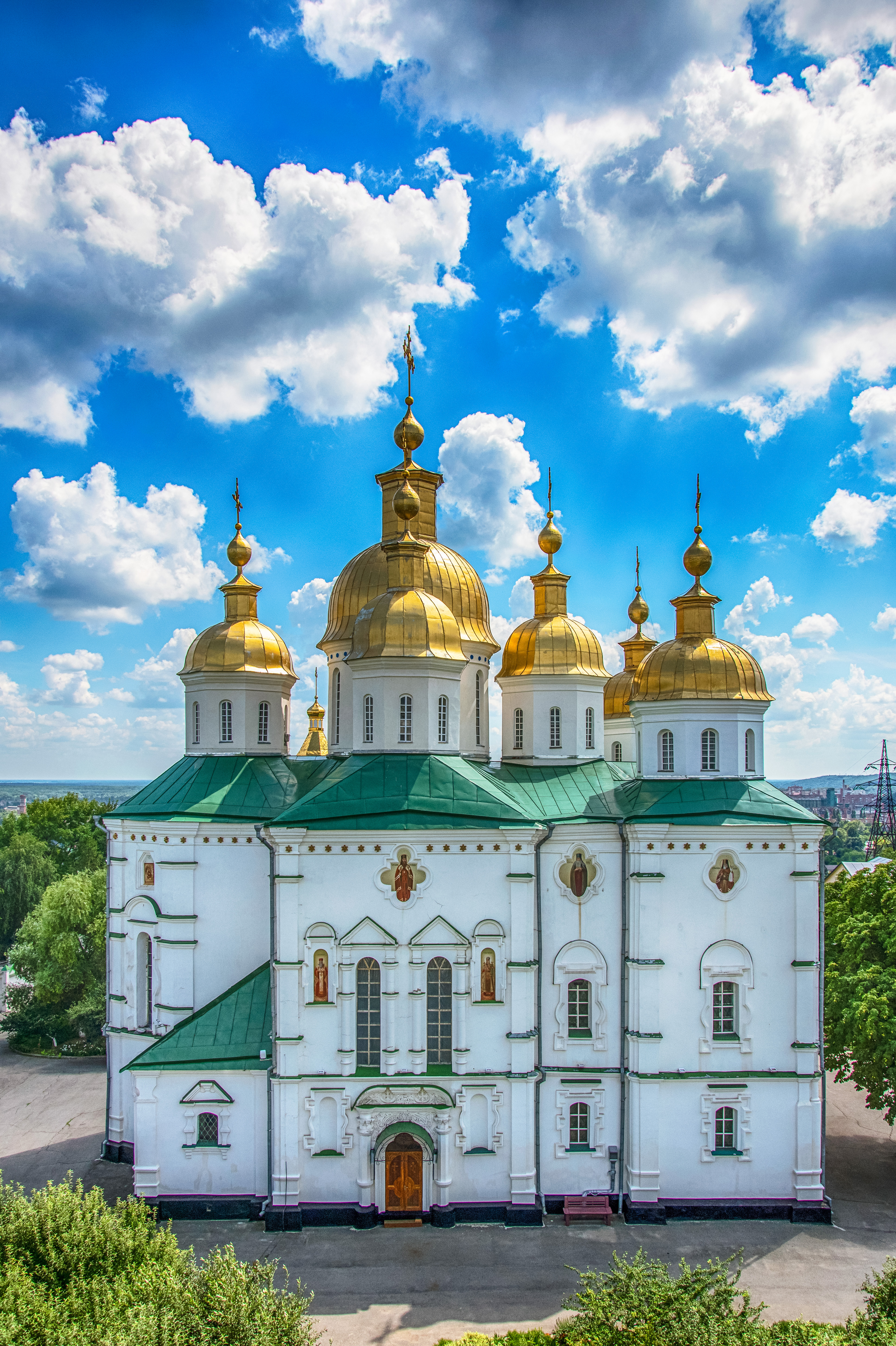
2018 photo of the cathedral

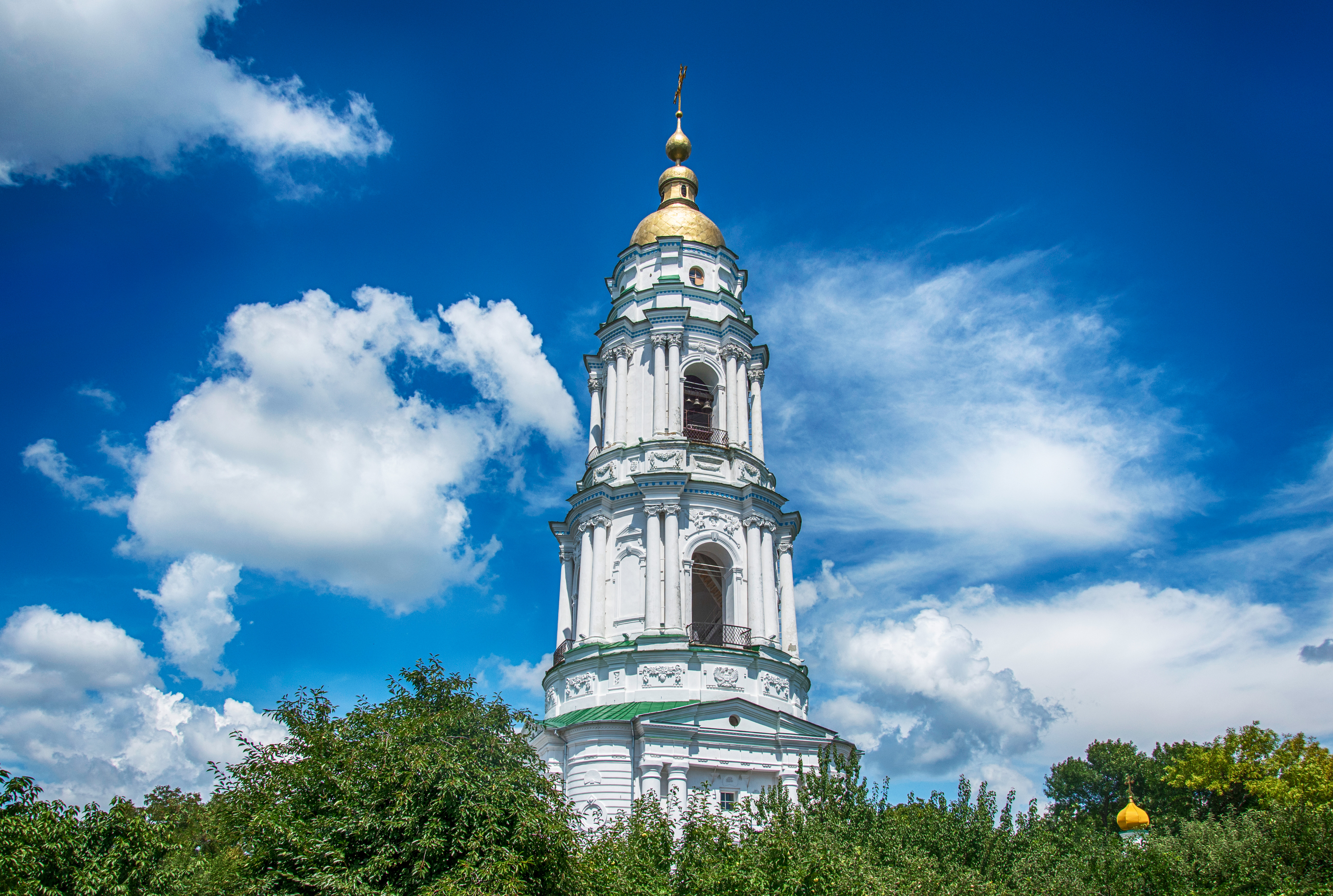
Bell tower (in 2018)

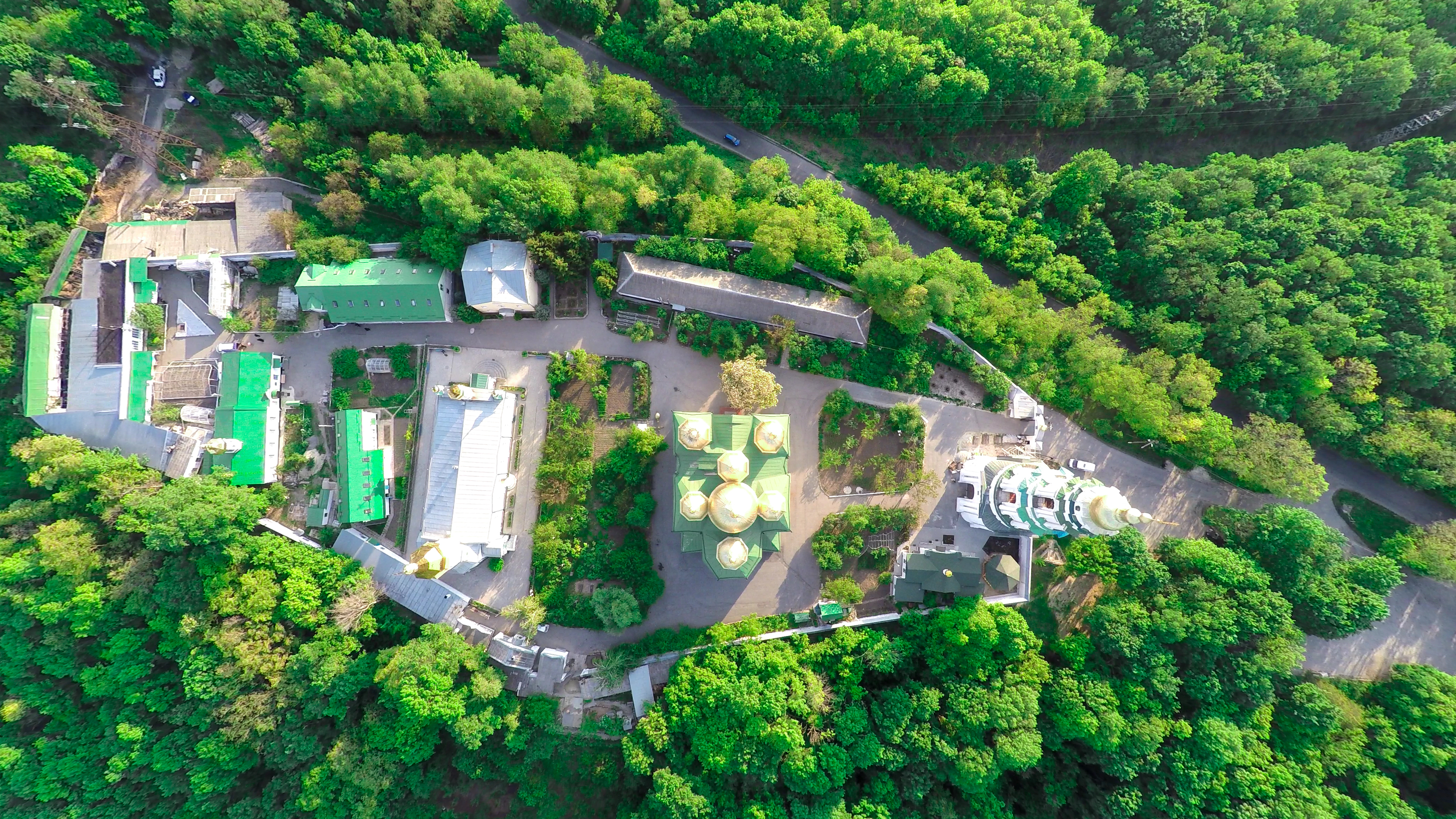
Aerial view (in 2015)

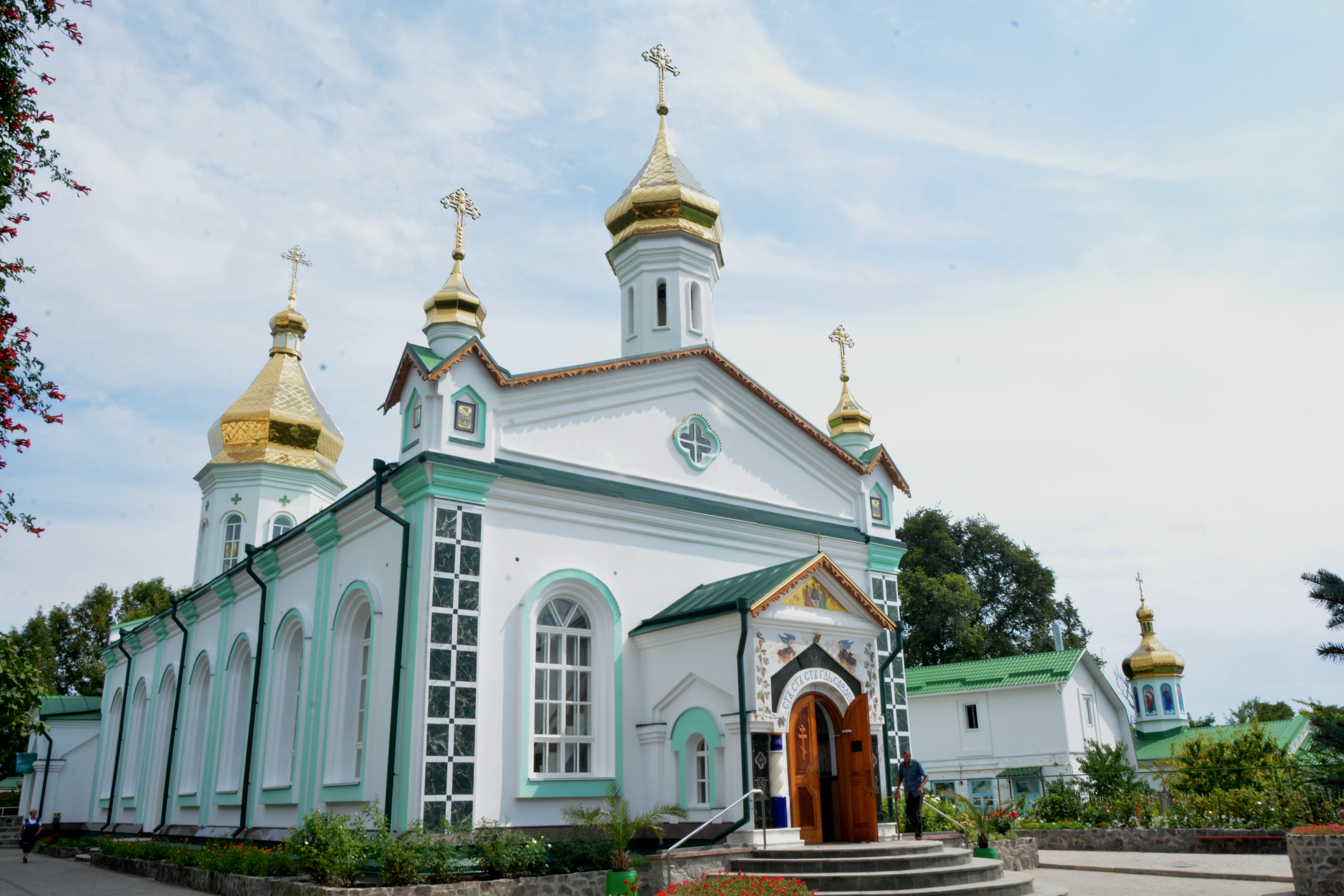
Refectory church

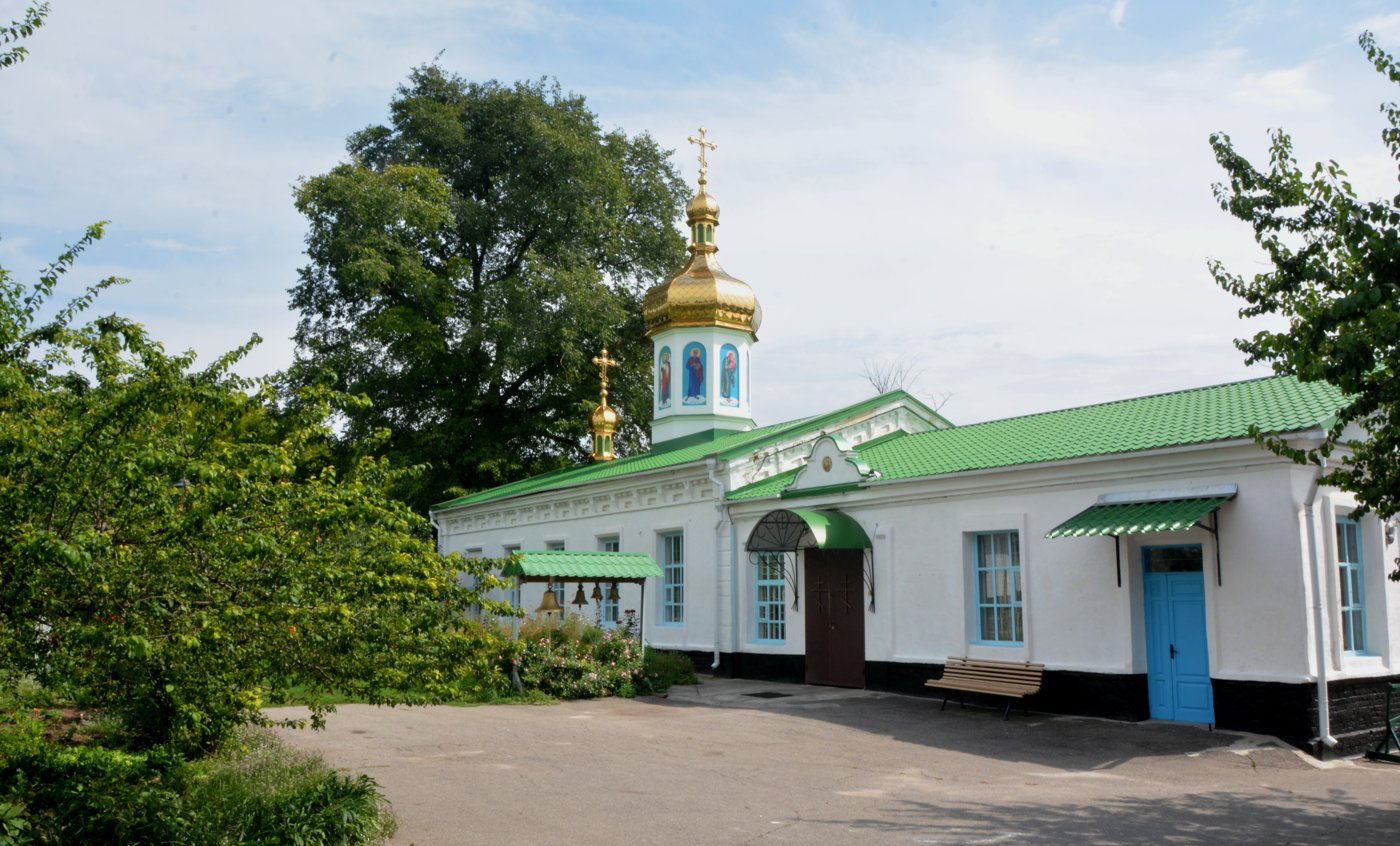
House of the Covenant (Monastery) superior
