= Marusia Churai =

Mythical Ukrainian composer

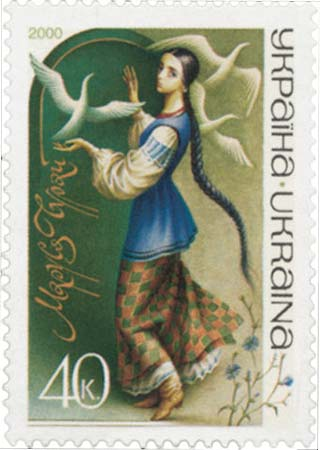
Ukrainian stamp featuring Churai

Maria or Marusia Churai (Ukrainian: Маруся Чурай; 1625–1653) was a mythical Ukrainian Baroque composer, poet, and singer. She became a recurrent motif in Ukrainian literature and the songs ascribed to her are widely performed in Ukraine.

According to the legend she was a native of Poltava (then in Crown of the Kingdom of Poland), and is regarded as the purported author as well as the subject of the well-known Ukrainian folk song "Oi Ne Khody Hrytsiu Tai na Vechornytsi" (Oh Gregory, Don't Go to the Evening Dances) known in the West as "Yes, My Darling Daughter".

== Life ==
No documentary evidence exists about Marusia Churai's life, and the historicity of her person is a subject of discussion. Alexander Shakhovskoy, the author of a 1839 biography dedicated to the legendary poetess, claimed to have received the information about her life from Hryhorii Kvitka-Osnovianenko. Some literary scholars consider the figure of Marusia Churai to be Shakhovskoy's own invention.

According to her traditional biography, Marusia was born around 1625 in Poltava, where she spent her whole life. Her father was supposed to be Hordii Churai, a Cossack sotnyk and one of the leaders of the Ostryanyn Uprising against the Polish rule. After the rebellion's defeat, Hordii was executed in Warsaw. Known for her great beauty, Marusia became an object of courtship from many people in her city, including young Cossack Ivan Iskra. However, she was said to have fallen in love with a certain Hryts Bobrenko, the son of a Poltava Regiment khorunzhy. The couple became engaged, but soon thereafter, in 1648, Hryts left the city to participate in the battles of the Khmelnytsky Uprising. Four years later, after his return from war, Marusia learned, that her loved one had fallen in love with another girl, and decided to poison herself. However, the poison was accidentally taken by Hryts himself, leading to his death. As a result, the city court of Poltava sentenced Marusia to death, but she was pardoned by a universal personally issued by Bohdan Khmelnytsky. It is said that later Marusia visited Kyiv to repent her sins, and died soon upon her return to Poltava, either because of the grief after Hryts, or due to tuberculosis. Another version claims that she became a nun.

== In literature ==
The legend of Marusia Churai was formed under the influence of 19th century literary works such as the novel "Marusia, Malorosiiskaia Sapfo" (Marusia, the Littlerussian Sappho) by A. Shakovskoy (1839). Many writers used the story of Marusia's love to Hryts in their works, among them Mykhailo Starytsky, Volodymyr Samiilenko,Olha Kobylianska, Ivan Mykytenko, Lina Kostenko, Levko Borovykovsky, Stepan Rudansky, Marko Kropyvnytsky and Borys Oliynyk. The verse novel Marusia Churai by Lina Kostenko became a laureate of the 1987 Shevchenko National Prize and was positively acclaimed by critics.

== Influence in music ==
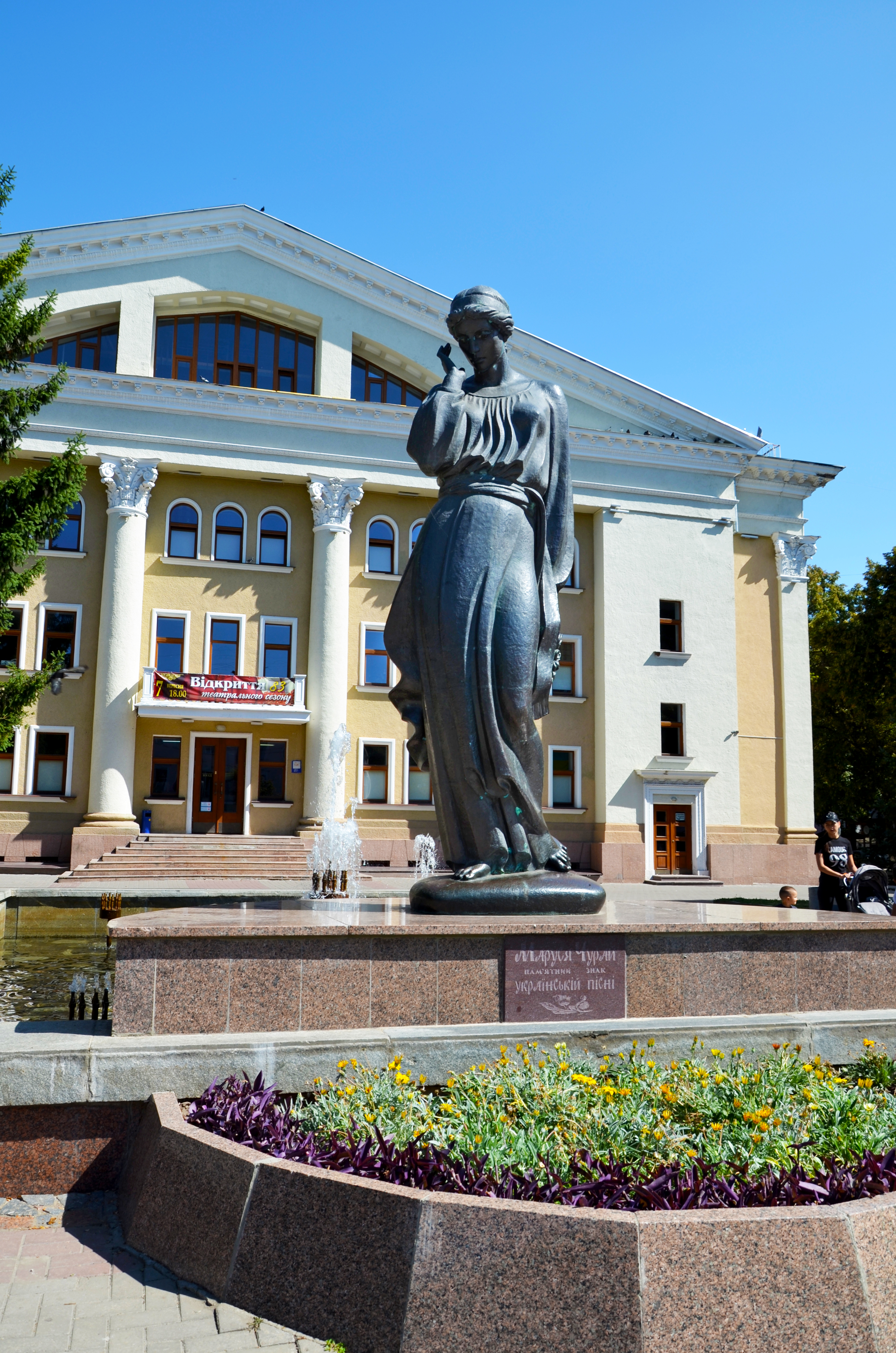
Marusia Churai Memorial in Poltava

The song "Oi Ne Khody Hrytsiu" was translated into Polish (1820), Czech (1822), German (1827), French (1830), English (1848) and other languages. However its melody is not of folk origin. It was first documented use was as an arietta from a vaudeville by a Venetian composer Catterino Cavos. The original English translation of the song "Oi Ne Khody Hrytsiu" was also made and performed in 2023 by Vol Deineko on finger-style guitar under the name "Don't Go to Party." The melody was used in Yes, My Darling Daughter, a 1941 song by Jack Lawrence.

Three other song texts that are ascribed to Marusia Churai: "Kotylysia Vozy z Hory" (The Wagons Were Rolling Downhill), "Viyut' Vitry" (Winds Are Blowing) and "Za Svit Staly Kozachenky" (The Kozaks Were Ready to March at Dawn). While the texts of these songs are of literary origin, their music is anonymous, from oral tradition. All the melodies that are attached to these texts date from the late 19th century. The text of the Ukrainian folk song "Oi ne khody Hrytsiu" was first published in English translation in London in 1816. A Polish translation first appeared in 1822 in Lviv and a German translation appeared in 1848. Evidence exists to the songs popularity in France (1830s), Czech, Slovak lands, Belgium and the United States where it was known along with the song "Ikhav kozak za Dunai" (The Cossack rode beyond the Danube) by Semen Klymovsky.

Marusia Churai was commemorated on a Ukrainian postage stamp in February 2000.

== External linkis ==
- Marusia Churai in Encyclopedia of Ukraine (in English)
