= Moshe Zvi Segal (rabbi) =

Rabbi (1904–1984)

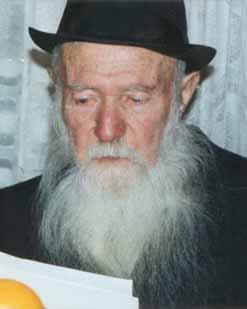
Moshe Zvi Segal

Moshe Zvi Segal (Hebrew: משה צבי סגל; 23 February 1904 – 25 September 1985) was a prominent figure in various movements and organizations in Israel, including Etzel and Lechi. He was awarded the Yakir Yerushalaim prize in 1974. He is best known for blowing the shofar at the conclusion of the Yom Kippur service at the Western Wall, defying the law of the British Mandate, which prohibited doing so.

== Biography ==
Moshe Zvi Segal was born on 23 February 1904 (6 Shevat 5664) in Poltava, Ukraine. His father was Abraham Mordechai Segal from Mohilov, situated above the Dnieper River in White Russia. His mother was Henna Leah Menkin, whose family moved from Mohilov to Vortinschina-Zeberzhia as farmers to escape the Tzar's decree to kidnap Jewish children from their homes, forcefully prevent them from religious observance, and recruit them in the army.

The seeds of Segal's love for Jerusalem and the Holy Land were sown at an early age, when he learned about the forefathers of the Jewish People, Abraham, Isaac and Jacob in the Torah.

In 1914, as a result of the First World War, the Mir Yeshiva relocated to Poltava. Segal studied there from the age of 10 until the age of 15. In 1919, when the yeshiva returned to Poland, Segal declined the Rosh Yeshiva's invitation to join them because of his prior obligation to assist his parents with the family's meagre finances.

During his years in the yeshiva, he was also an avid reader of books at Poltava's Hebrew Library. His reading significantly broadened his knowledge of Jewish philosophy in the Middle Ages and later generations.

At the age of 17, Segal was accepted as a member of the HeHalutz Jewish underground organization in Poltava.

In 1924, at the age of 20, Segal immigrated with his parents and siblings to the land of Israel (then under the British Mandate for Palestine).

In 1929, in response to King George V's decrees limiting Jewish rights and religious observance in Palestine and Jerusalem, Segal organized a large demonstration to the Kotel on 9 Av, the day of Jewish national mourning.

During the 1929 Palestine riots and the pogroms in Hebron and Safed he defended Tel Aviv as a member of the Haganah. He later co-founded the Etzel military movement. Segal was also one of the founders of Brit HaBirionim.

In 1930, Segal prayed the Yom Kippur service at the Western Wall. He borrowed a shofar from Rabbi Isaac Orenstein, then Chief Rabbi of the Western Wall, and hid it until the end of the Ne'ila service when it is the custom to sound the shofar. When the service reached its climax, Segal boldly blew the shofar for all to hear, against the law of the British Mandate, and was promptly arrested for doing so. Upon hearing of the incident, Chief Rabbi Abraham Isaac Kook announced that he would not break his fast until the young Segal was allowed to eat. Rabbi Kook telephoned the British High Commissioner of Palestine requesting Segal's release, and at about midnight that same evening, he was freed. In the years that followed, until the founding of the State of Israel in 1948, Segal arranged that a shofar be smuggled into the Western Wall area and he trained young men to sound it at the appropriate moment every year at the end of the Yom Kippur service.

== Organizations ==
Throughout his life, Segal was a member of a number of organizations, some of which he founded himself.

- 1916: Tikvat Yisrael youth organization, Poltava
- 1920: Tzeirei Tzion, Poltava
- 1920: HeHalutz Ha'Adom, Poltava
- 1926: Hagana
- 1926: Hatzohar
- 1927: Tenuat HaRechvim
- 1927: Gedud Meginei HaSafah
- 1930: Agudat HaShomer Bagalil
- 1931-1932: Brit HaBirionim
- 1931: Etzel
- 1937: Brit Hahashmonaim
- 1943: Lechi
- 1943: Aguda Le'Ma'an HaShabbat
- 1943: Machane Yisrael
- 1946: Le'Asireinu
- 1948: Tzeirei Chabad
- 1968: Herut
- 1972: El Har Hashem
- 1978: Chashmonaim Movement
- 1979: Tehiya
- 1982: Shevut Ha'Aretz
- 1985: Shavei Tziyon
