= Martyn Pushkar =

Martyn Pushkar Мартин Пушкар
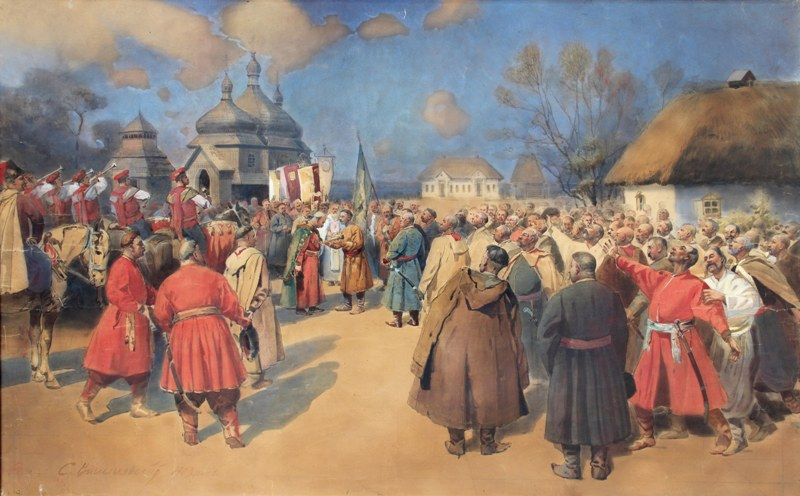
- Pushkar's election as Poltava colonel depicted by Serhiy Vasylkivsky

Polkovnik of the Poltava regiment
- In office 1649 – 1 June 1658
- Preceded by: Iskra Ivan Yakovych
- Succeeded by: Fylon Harkusha

Personal details
- Died: 1 June 1658 Poltava, Hetmanate
- Spouse: Ulyana NN
- Religion: Eastern Orthodox

Martyn Pushkar (Ukrainian: Мартин Пушкар; died 1 June 1658) was a Ukrainian Cossack military leader. From 1648 he was polkovnik of Poltava regiment. After Bohdan Khmelnytsky's death, Pushkar, being one of the senior colonels in the Hetman State, was considered a candidate for the hetmancy, but Ivan Vyhovsky was elected instead. Together with Iakiv Barabash Pushkar led an uprising against Vyhovsky in 1657. After inflicting several defeats on Vyhovsky's Cossacks and his Crimean allies, Martyn Pushkar was killed in a battle near his native Poltava on 1 June 1658. His rebellion ended in failure. He founded the Exaltation of the Cross Monastery, which was built in a Cossack Baroque style in Poltava, to commemorate a victory over the Poles.

== Literature ==
- Кривошея В. «Еліти нації і еліта суспільства»: (або деякі питання української генеалогії) / Розбудова держави — 1997 — No. 11. — С. 48-55
- Горобець В. Мартин Пушкар / «Історія України в особах: козаччина». — К. : Україна, 2000. — С. 84-92
- Мокляк В. «Полтавщина козацька (від Люблінської унії до Коломацької ради» / 2008. — 264 с.
- Енциклопедія українознавства : Словникова частина : в 11 т. / Наукове Товариство ім. Шевченка; гол. ред. проф., д-р Володимир Кубійович. — Париж; Нью-Йорк; Львів : Молоде життя, 1954–2003.
