= Marusia Churai Memorial =

Sculpture in Poltava, Ukraine

- Пам'ятник Марусі Чурай, Пам'ятник українській пісні (Ukrainian)
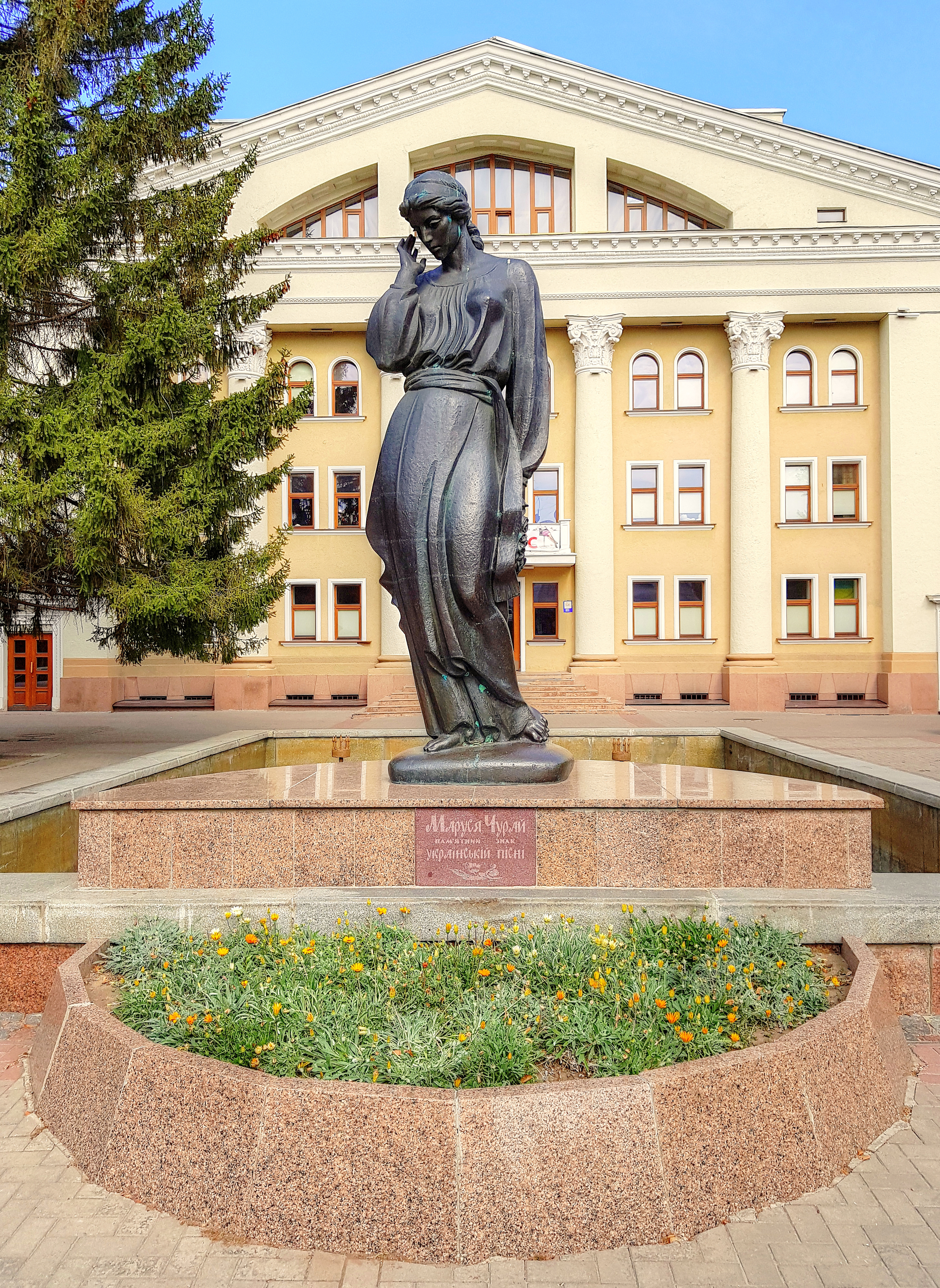
- The statue in September 2019
- Artist: Dmytro Korshunov and Valeriy Holub
- Year: 14 April 2006; 20 years ago
- Type: copper
- Location: Regional Musical-Dramatic Theatre Nikolai Gogol; Poltava, Ukraine; 49°35′8.153″N 34°33′21.942″E

Marusia Churai Memorial (Ukrainian: Пам'ятник Марусі Чурай) is a standing figure of Marusia Churai sculpted by Dmytro Korshunov and Valeriy Holub in Poltava, Ukraine. It is located in the Regional Musical-Dramatic Theatre Nikolai Gogol on Nebesnoyi Sotni Street, the centre of Poltava.

The figure was established on 14 April 2006. It had been built for three months: first modelled with clay, then with concrete, and finally covered with copper.

Residents nicknamed the figure "Girl with mobile phone" (Дівчина з мобілкою) for its posture as Churai's head slid to the right and her right hand raised, resembling a woman who is using mobile phones.
