= Mykola Karpov =

Mykola Karpov (Ukrainian: Микола Олексійович Карпов; 8 July 1929 in Poltava – 6 April 2003 in Kyiv) was a Ukrainian screenwriter.

== Early life ==
Karpov took part in the Great Patriotic War (Second World War), being a sea cadet in the Black Sea Fleet at the age of 14. He graduated from the Central Komsomol School department of journalism in 1956 and from the Taras Shevchenko Kyiv State University history department in 1962.

== Government career ==
Karpov worked for Komsomol and the Communist Party. He was editor-in-chief of the central administrative board in film production of Ministry of Culture of the Ukrainian SSR. From 1976 to 2000, he was a secretary of the Committee of the National Union of Cinematographers of Ukraine.

== Works ==
Karpov was the screenwriter of numerous films, including:

- The Duty of Everyone
- Landing Force to Immortality (1965)
- Commander Dybenko (1966)
- Mamai Barrow
- Brest Fortress
- Ships are Going (1969)
- We are Communists (1971)
- Four Orders of Commander Fedko
- The First Flag of soviet Fleet (1979)
- Young Chief (1982)

His books include:

- Young Chief (1958)
- Towards Storm (1960)
- Through Gales and Storms (1961)
- Mysterious Olena (1962)
