= Viktor Buhaievskyi =

Soviet footballer (1939–2009)

Personal information
- Full name: Viktor Andriiovych Buhaievskyi
- Date of birth: 10 April 1939
- Place of birth: Poltava
- Date of death: April 2009 (aged 69–70)
- Height: 1.75 m (5 ft 9 in)
- Positions: Defender; midfielder

Youth career
- 1956–1958: Kolhospnyk Poltava

Senior career*
Years	Team	Apps	(Gls)
1958–1961	Kolhospnyk Poltava	71+	(6+)
1962–1964	CSKA Kyiv	49+	(9)
1965–1967	Kolhospnyk Poltava	81+	(10)
1968	Dnipro Kremenchuk	39	(0)
1969–1970	Avanhard Zhovti Vody	4+	
1970–1973	Promin Poltava		
1974–1979	Suputnyk Poltava		
- * Club domestic league appearances and goals

Viktor Buhaievskyi (Ukrainian: Віктор Андрійович Бугаєвський, Russian: Виктор Андреевич Бугаевский; 10 April 1939 – 2009) was a Soviet and Ukrainian professional footballer who played as a defender and midfielder. He was one of the best midfielders in Soviet Second League class B (1963–69) who played in close to 330 matches.

== Early life ==
Viktor Buhaievskyi was born on 10 April 1939 in Poltava. He began playing football at a young age as a goalkeeper. While attending school number thirteen in Poltava, he was involved in gymnastics, volleyball, athletics, and basketball. He was playing for his school team as a midfielder in the city school championship. Ivan Horpynko a coach for preparation group attached to Kolhospnyk Poltava saw his potential and invited him to train with them in 1956. He completed ten years of schooling, and enrolled in technical school No. 1. After completing ten grades of school education, he attended Poltava State Agrarian Academy for his higher education.

== Playing career ==
During 1958 he joined Kolhospnyk Poltava main team. He made his debut on 18 June. After playing for the club for four years, Buhaievskyi was called up to do his conscription service in 1962. Next three years he spent in CSKA Kyiv. During 1962 he also played for the national team made up of the second league players. In 1964 his team finished first in their zone and won silver medals for finishing second in the league. After he was discharged Buhaievskyi returned to Kolhospnyk Poltava now renamed Kolos. He played there for three years. In 1986 he joined neighboring club Dnipro Kremenchuk. At the end of the year he left Dnipro. In 1969 he joined Avanhard Zhovti Vody. He spent two years at the club. He returned to Poltava to play in Poltava Oblast championship for Promin Poltava from 1970 to 73. In 1974 Buhaievskyi moved to Suputnyk Poltava and played there for five years. After retiring he continued to play for veterans teams.

== Personal life ==
Viktor had two younger brothers Oleksandr and Andrii. Both were training to be footballers.

== Sources ==
- Pyrukhin, Yurii (n.d.a), Днепр Кременчуг футбол 1963-1969 [Dnipro Kremenchuk football 1963-1969] (in Ukrainian), Kremenchuk
- Pyrukhin, Yurii (n.d.c), Полтава 1955-1967 (КФК-Класс Б) [Poltava 1955–1967 (KFK-Klas B)] (in Russian), Kremenchuk
- Lomov, Anatolii; Kryvorotko, Serhii (2010), Энциклопеди Полтавского Футбола (1909-2010) [Encyclopedia of Poltava Football (1909-2010)] (in Russian), Poltava: OOO "ASMI", ISBN 978-966-182-118-6
- Lomov, Anatolii (2015), "Ворскла" (Полтава) в лицах, событиях, фактах. 1955-2015 ["Vorskla" (Poltava) in faces, events, facts. 1955-2015] (in Russian), Poltava: Dyvosvit, ISBN 978-617-633-116-2
- Kolomiiets, Anatolii (2010), Киевский футбол на рубежах времен. Люди, cобытия, факты. II том (1961-1991 гг.) [Kyiv football at the turn of the times. People, events, facts. Volume II (1961-1991)] (in Russian), Kyiv: A-Dept, ISBN 978-966-2966-07-7
- Merkushev, Mykola; Hnatiuk, Vasyl (2011), Желтоводский футбол [Zhovti Vody football] (in Russian), Zhovti Vody
