= Poltava Regiment =

Poltava Regiment Полтавський полк
- Regimental coat of arms
- Active: 1648–1775
- Country: Cossack Hetmanate
- Type: Cossack Regiment
- Size: 19 sotnias, 2970 Cossacks (1649)
- Garrison/HQ: Poltava

Commanders
- Notable commanders: Martyn Pushkar; Prokіp Levenets; Ivan Iskra

Poltava Regiment Полтавський полк (Ukrainian)
- Regiment of Cossack Hetmanate
- 1648–1775
- Coat of arms

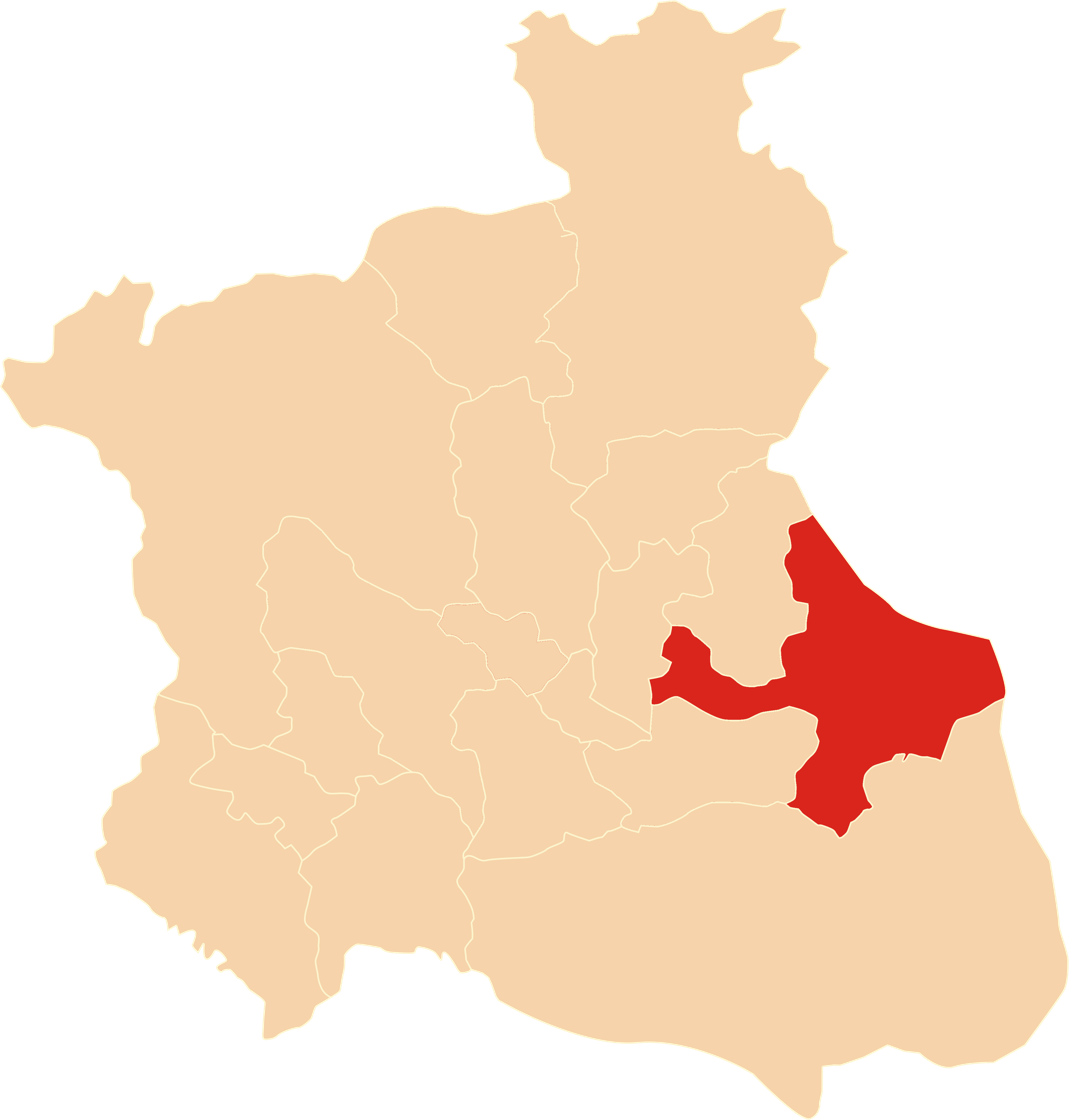
- Regiment's territory as of 1660 (in red)
- Capital: Poltava
- History
  - Khmelnytsky Uprising: 1648
  - Creation of Novorossiya Governorate: 1775
Preceded by	Succeeded by
Kiev Voivodeship	Novorossiya Governorate
- Today part of: Ukraine

The Poltava Regiment (Ukrainian: Полтавський полк) was one of ten territorial-administrative subdivisions of the Cossack Hetmanate. The regiment's capital was the city of Poltava, now in Poltava Oblast of central Ukraine.

== History ==
The Poltava Regiment was founded in 1648 during the Khmelnytsky Uprising. Following the signing of the Treaty of Zboriv in 1649 it consisted of 19 sotnias, and had 2970 Registered Cossacks. In 1654 the regiment's Cossacks refused to pledge allegiance to tsar Alexis I of Russia according to the Treaty of Pereyaslav. In 1658 the regiment's commander Martyn Pushkar rose up in a rebellion against hetman Ivan Vyhovsky, which ended with defeat and burning of Poltava by the hetman's forces. In 1664 the regiment was attacked by troops of Right-bank hetman Pavlo Teteria. In 1666 the regiment rebelled against Left-bank hetman Ivan Briukhovetsky.

During the 18th century Poltava regiment functioned as one of 10 administrative subdivisions of the Hetmanate. In 1775, the regiment was officially abolished, and its territory was incorporated into the New Russia Governorate.

== Structure ==
According to the 1649 Register of the Zaporozhian Host, the regiment consisted of following sotnias:

- Poltava (2)
- Zinkiv
- Kobeliaky
- Opishnia
- Bahachka
- Birky (2)
- Kuzemyn
- Kovalivka
- Balakliia
- Lukimia
- Vepryk
- Hadiach (2)
- Podil
- Rashava
- Liutenka

== Gallery ==
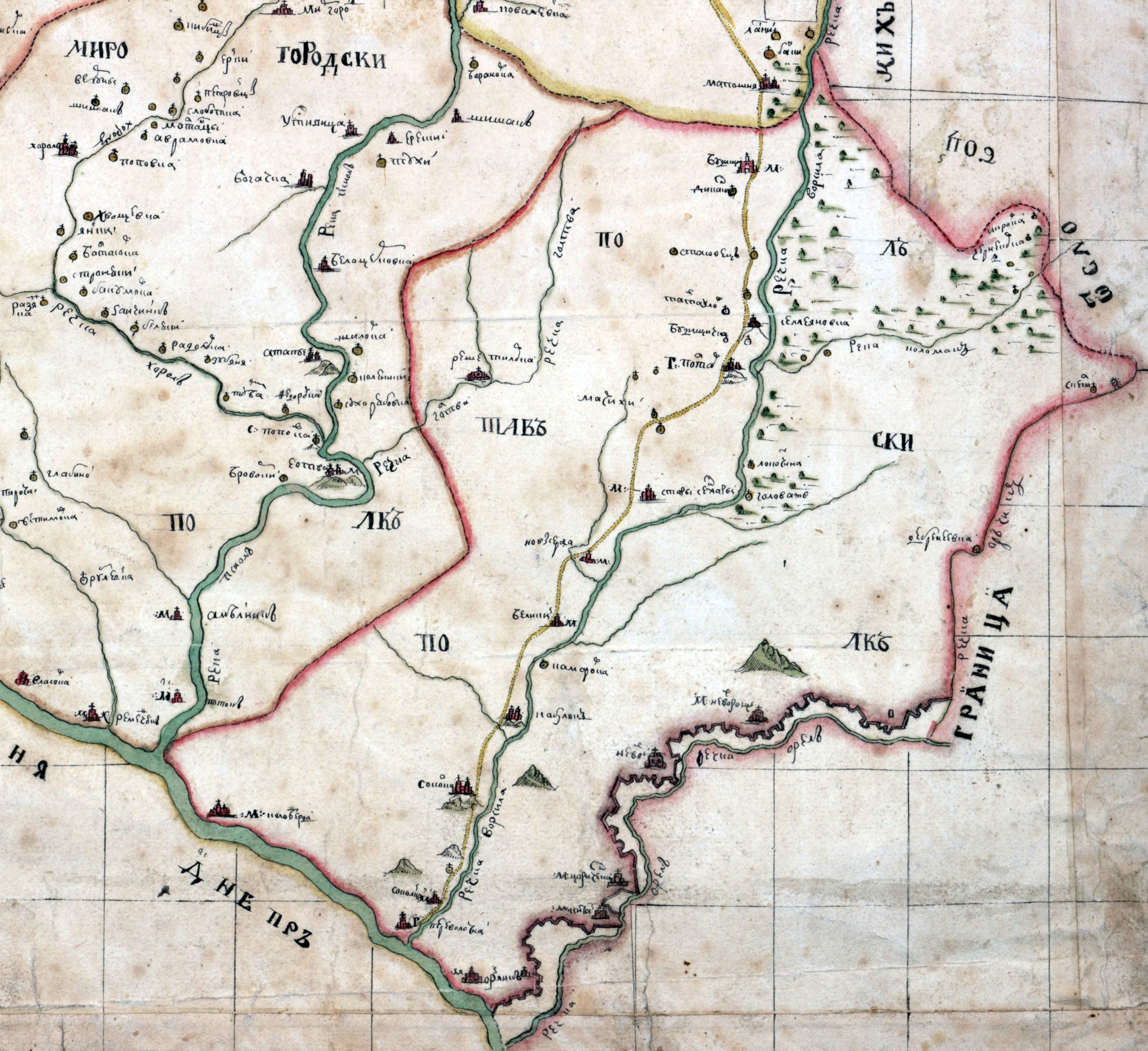
Poltava Regiment during the mid-18th century

18th-century coat of arms

== Sources ==
- Заруба В. М. Адміністративно-територіальний устрій Війська Запорозького у 1648-1782 рр., Дніпропетровськ, 2007.
- Горобець В. Історія українського козацтва//Полково-сотенний устрій Гетьманату. Нариси у 2-х томах.
- В. О. Мокляк. Джерела з історії Полтавського полку. Середина XVII–XVIII ст. Т. І: Компути та ревізії Полтавського полку. Компут 1649 р. Компут 1718 р. Полтава: АСМІ 2007.
