= Lechi =

Lechi is an Italian surname. Notable people with the surname include:

- Francesca Lechi (1773–1806), Italian revolutionary and figure in Milanese society
- Giuseppe Lechi (1766 – 1836), Italian general in the Kingdom of Italy during the Napoleonic War
- Teodoro Lechi (1778 – 1866), Italian general
