= Ivan Iskra =

Cossack colonel and dissident

Ivan Ivanovych Iskra (Ukrainian: Іван Іванович Іскра) (died July, 14, 1708) was a renegade colonel of Poltava Regiment of Ukrainian Cossacks (1696–1703). Iskra belonged to the anti-Hetmanate coalition led by Vasily Kochubey. In late 1707, Kochubey and Iskra delivered a denunciation letter to the Tsar's court that accused Ivan Mazepa of initiating talks with Stanislaus Leszczynski of Poland and Charles XII of Sweden.

Peter I did not believe the letter and beheaded them both. Later, when the Tsar realized that they were correct, they were reburied near the Refectory Church in Kiev Pechersk Monastery.
