= Semenivka Raion =

Semenivka Raion can refer to:

- Semenivka Raion, Chernihiv Oblast, Ukraine
- Semenivka Raion, Poltava Oblast, Ukraine
