= Tymofiy Morokhovets =

- Born: Tymofiy Morokhovets; 16 November 1983 (age 42); Polyove, Smolensk region, Russia
- Origin: Ukraine
- Genres: Rock
- Occupations: Musician, singer, songwriter, composer, lawyer
- Instruments: Vocals, guitar, drums
- Years active: 2003–present
- Label: Independent
- Website: Official PanKe Shava web-site

Tymofiy Morokhovets (Ukrainian: Мороховець Тимофій Леонідович; born November 16, 1983, in Polyove, Smolensk region, Russia) is a frontman and founder of Ukrainian band PanKe Shava, songwriter and composer, the author of all PanKe Shava songs.

== Biography ==
Tymofiy Morokhovets was born on November 16, 1983, in Polyove, Smolensk region, Russia, in the family of public servants.

On finishing school he studied in Academy of Municipal Administration on Presidential scholarship, worked as a journalist for several publishers, and as a presenter at different events and concerts. On achieving a master's degree in Jurisprudence, he headed the legal department of Sundara LTD, and from May 2005 to November 2007 worked as a creative director of the company.

He was actively engaged in social activities: from June 1999 – the member of Democratic Youth League (Poltava branch), from 1999 to 2001 – the member of Democratic Youth League board. From 30.08.1999 to 09.09.2001 – the head of Dykanka branch of Democratic Youth League. Between October 2001 and September 10, 2005 – the member of Kyiv branch of Democratic Youth League board, the head of the organization of Democratic Youth League at Academy of Municipal Administration.

Since 2005, the owner of Povitryanyi zmiy (English: The Kite) art agency.

Since 2008 – the head of Conceptual Art Workshop NGO, coordinator at Otrokiv festival (Khmelnitsky region), the organizer of PanKe Shava Live Aid Festival, the author and presenter of radio programs and concerts Sabbath (Poltava), the owner of the studio Because Records.

Worked as a creative director of jewelry company Jonardano.

Since 2013 - art director of Woodstock Ukraine festival.

== Musical career ==
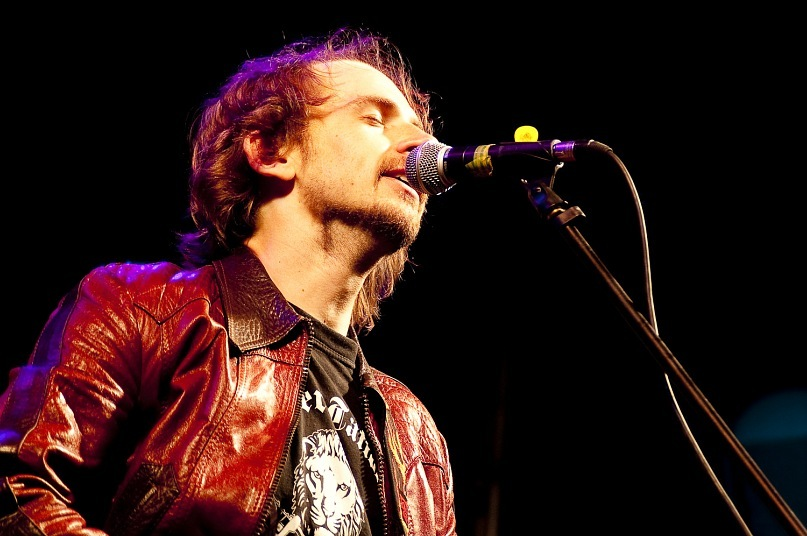
Tymofiy at the performance, 2011

Tymofiy graduated the class of percussion instruments, but on the stage acts as a guitarist and vocalist.

In 2003 he founded the musical band Povitryanyi zmiy (English: The Kite) with Vyacheslav Boroday and Andrew "Jordan" Cherkasov (now - bass guitar player of the band Atmasfera).

In 2008, Tymofiy Morokhovets created music band PanKe Shava, that develops until now. The band several times changed its members and location - moved from Lviv to Poltava, and now is based in Kyiv.
