= Coat of arms of Poltava Oblast =

Symbol of Poltava region, Ukraine

Versions
- Armiger: Poltava Oblast
- Adopted: 30 January 1998
- Shield: Azure

The coat of arms of Poltava Oblast is the official coat of arms of Poltava Oblast, Ukraine.

== Description ==
The coat of arms consists of a shield divided into quarters by raspberry lozenge, crossed by argent and azure wavy belt.

- In first azure part is gold paty cross.
- In second gold part is gules horseshoe.
- In third gold part is gules heart.
- In fourth azure part is gold wheat sheaf.

In first part of lozenge is gold bow, accompanied by two or stars, in second is gold gates with three towers, accompanied by two gold stars.

- Bow with arrow and stars are the elements which went into Poltava and Pyriatyn coats of arms, indicate on historic role the edges in defence of own earths, and also Poltava as administrative centre.
- Urban gates with three towers and flagpoles - element of coats of arms depicting the Trans-Sula Tower of Lokhvytsia fortress. It indicates on durability, power, edge inviolability, Cossack traditions.
- The water wave is an element of Horishni Plavni, Kremenchuk, Lubny emblems, symbolizes riches of water spaces.
- The Cossack cross is located on historic colours of Poltava regiments and Myrhorod, Zinkiv, Karlivka, Kobeliaky emblems.
- The horseshoe is an element of patrimonial Ukraine coats of arms and is depicted on Karlivka, Karlivka Raion, Kozelshchyna Raion emblems; it is a symbol of happiness, good, love, and consent.
- The heart is a hetman coat of arms element of Pavlo Polubotok, Vasyl Kochubey, and symbolises Poltava Oblast as Ukraine's heart, her grandeur, spirituality, and as the earth that gave birth to prominent figures of world significance.
- The sheaf can be found on Hlobyne and Karlivka Raion emblems and personifies natural resource, earth's fertility, industry of its inhabitants, national traditions.
- The crown represents power, firmness, grandeur and glory.

Adopted colours:

- Raspberry, a color associated with the Cossacks, represents power and bravery.
- Azure means fighting for freedom and hope.
- Golden represents the Sun, light, welfare, kindness, work, and dignity.

== History ==
Coat of arms in the XVII century

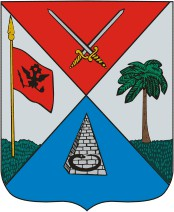
Coat of arms of the Poltava Governorate (1803)

Coat of arms of the Poltava Governorate (1878-1918)
