= PanKe Shava =

Ukrainian rock band

- Origin: Kyiv, Ukraine
- Genres: Rock, funk rock, blues rock, folk rock
- Years active: 2008–present
- Label: Independent
- Members: Tymofiy Morokhovets; Katia Perekopska; Pavlo Gvozdetskyi; Vadym Poltorak; Andriy Vashchenko; Nikita Perekopskyi
- Past members: Roman Antipov; Sviatoslav Babii; Serb Svirskyi; Oleksiy Dibrova; Vitaliy Vialyi; Sashka Chech; Bohdan Shkurynskyi; Alex Popel; Ivan Sopelniak; Pavel Molukevich; Taras Melnychenko; Max Kortes
- Website: www.panke-shava.com

PanKe Shava is a Ukrainian rock band founded by Tymofiy Morokhovets in 2008 in Lviv. PanKe Shava plays music that can be described as "rock'n'love" with the elements of ethno music. The band uses such instrumental highlights as a violin, trumpet and xylophone.

== History ==
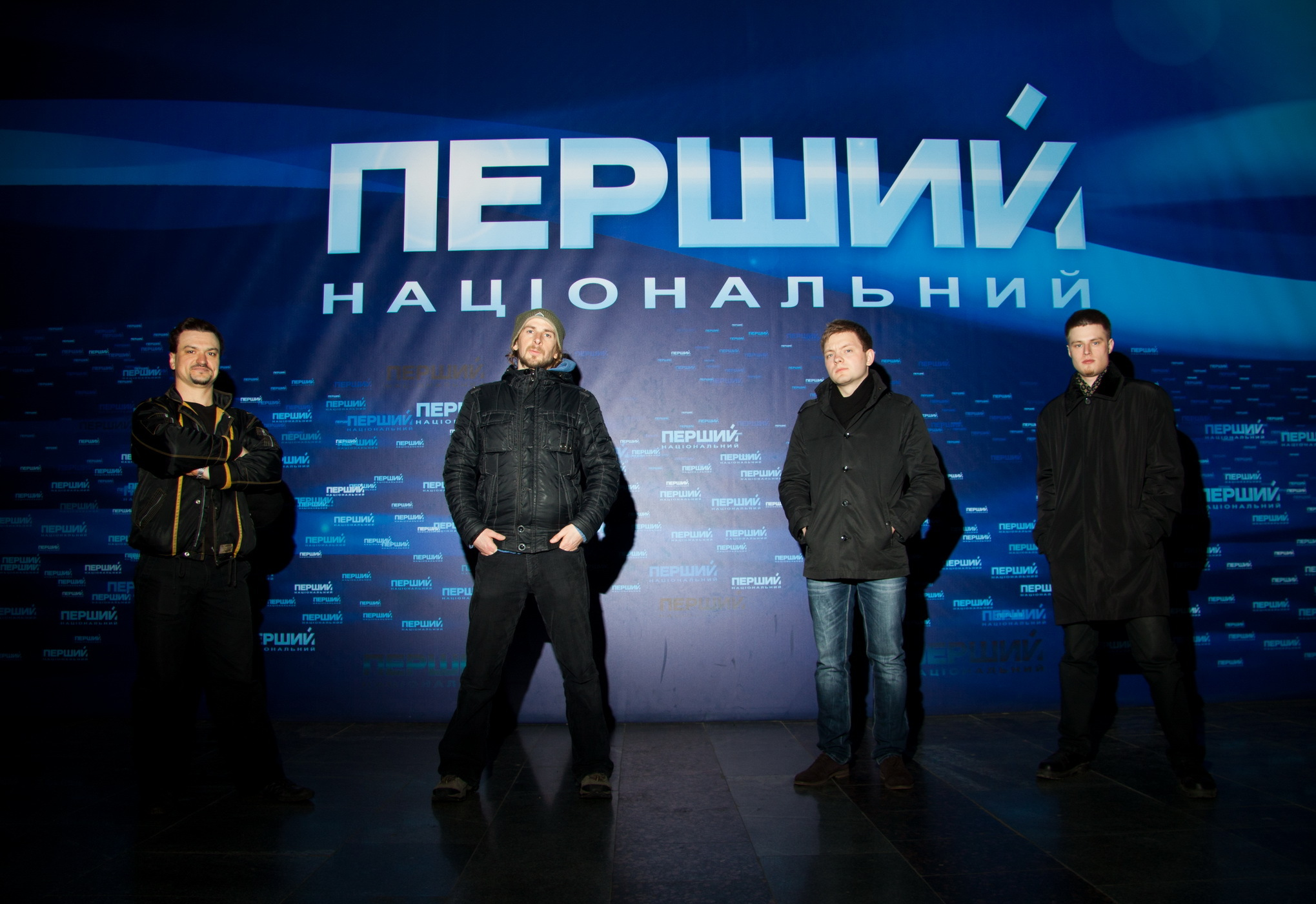
PanKe Shava on the largest TV music marathon that entered the Guinness Book of Records

The band PanKe Shava was founded by the Kite (Ukrainian: Повітряний змій) frontman Tymofiy Morokhovets in 2008 in Lviv. The band has changed its staff and location few times, moving from Lviv to Poltava and is based in Kyiv now.

The artists popularize Ukrainian culture in Poland and other countries in an acceptable for modern youth form.

Since its founding, PanKe Shava has performed and headlined at the various music festivals throughout the world: Austin City Limits Music Festival (USA), Noc Kultury (Poland), Fluhery Lvova (Ukraine), Chervona Ruta (Ukraine), Columbus Arts Festival (USA), Europejski Stadion Kultury (Poland), Bitwa Narodow (Poland), The Festival of British Rock (Ukraine), Gipper Tattoo Fest (Ukraine), Otrokiv (Ukraine), Mlynomania (Ukraine), Studrespublika (Ukraine), Battle of the Nations (Ukraine), Vyo Kobelyaky (Ukraine).

Moreover, in 2012 the band participated in the largest TV music marathon on The First National Channel of Ukraine that entered the Guinness Book of Records.

In 2013 PanKe Shava performed at such big festivals as Rock'n'Sich (Ukraine), Bataille des Nations (France), The Best City.UA (Ukraine), Woodstock Ukraine, Przystanek Woodstock (Poland), Bandershtat (Ukraine), and participated in a number of gala concerts on the central square of Ukraine – Maydan Nezalezhnosti.

Since 2010, every winter PanKe Shava has been touring in Ukraine with P.S.Love Tour, and in 2013 Ukrainian music program Kvadrat U shot a movie about the day of the band's life during this tour.

Tha band is involved in social projects and plays music programs in higher educational establishments, organizes charity concerts as a voluntary contribution to the cultural development of the young people, participates in the programs aimed to promote healthy lifestyle among the youth, to train cultural and moral values, to prevent such negative phenomena in society as drug addiction and alcoholism.

In 2013 the band PanKe Shava cooperated actively with funds Great Orchestra of Christmas Charity (the concert on 13 January during WOŚP Grand Finale in Warsaw) and Heart to heart (Ukraine) (the concert for the Hear the world! action).

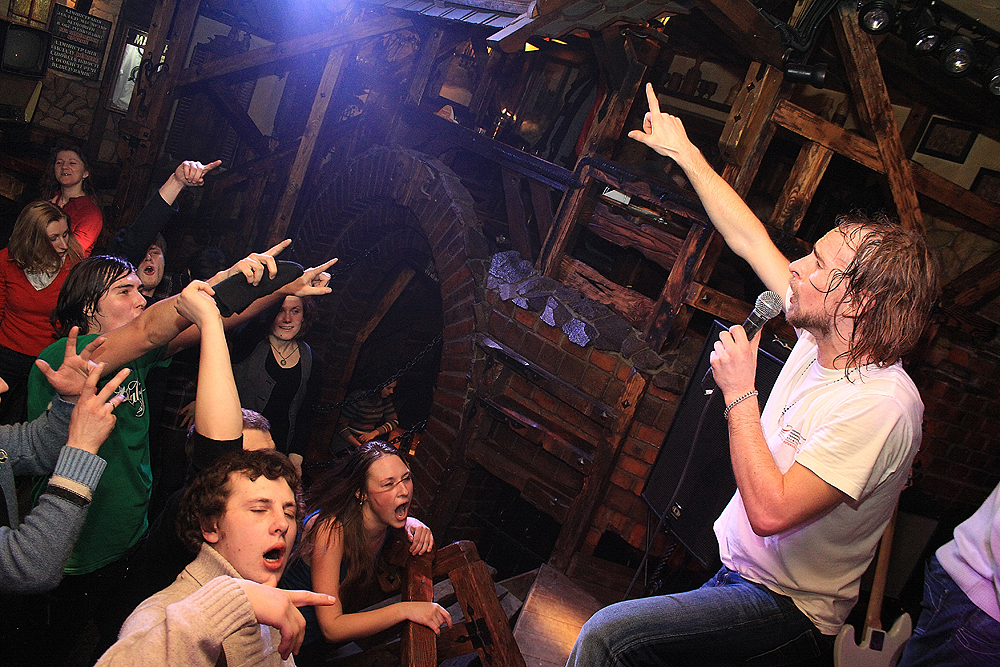
P.S. LOVE TOUR 2012

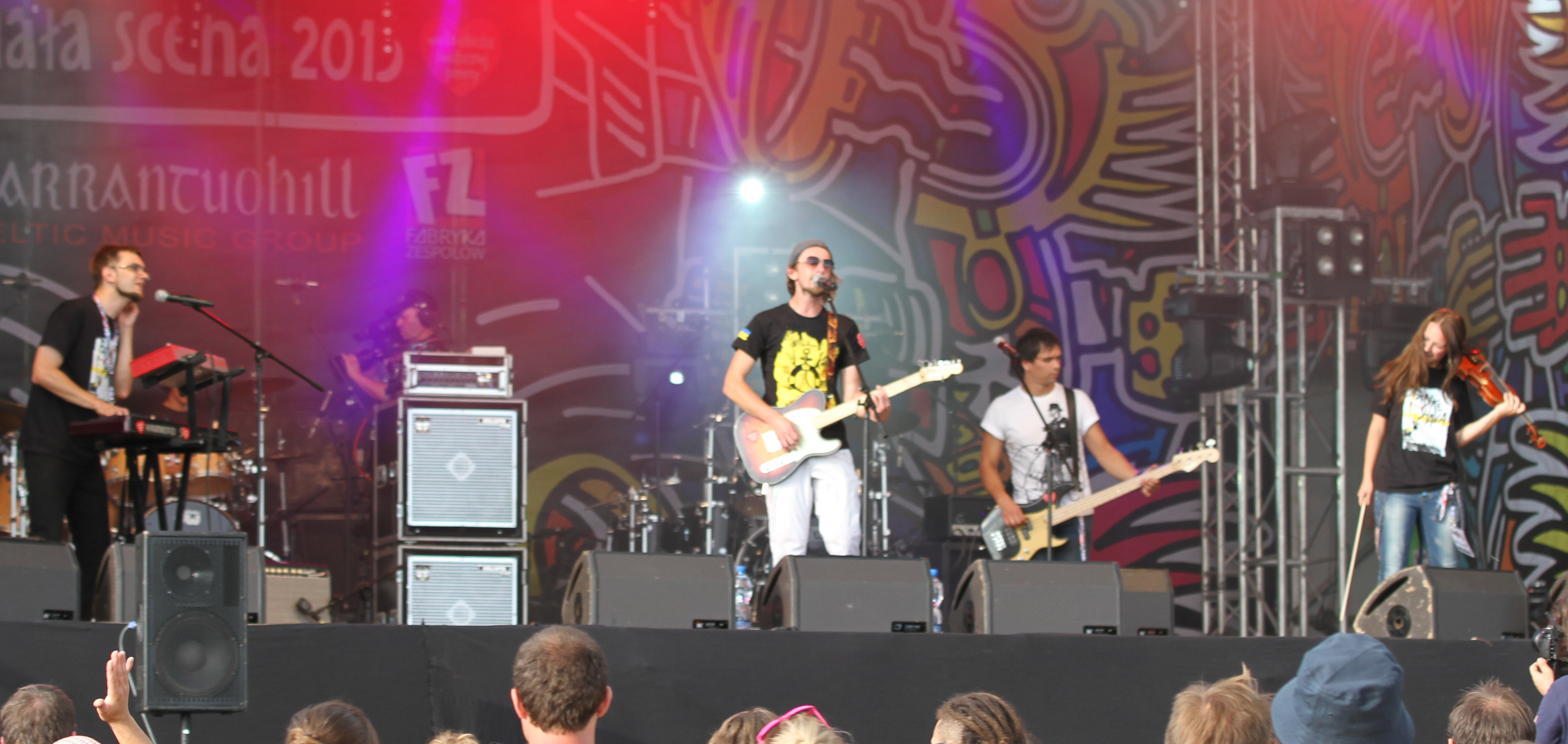
PanKe Shava at Przystanek Woodstock

== Members ==
=== Current members ===
- Tymofiy Morokhovets — vocals, guitar
- Katia Perekopska – violin
- Pavlo Gvozdetskyi – keyboard, vocals
- Vadym Poltorak – bass guitar, backing vocals
- Andriy Vashchenko – drums
- Nikita Perekopskyi – trumpet

=== Former members ===
- Roman Antipov – percussion (2008)
- Sviatoslav Babii – percussion (till 2009)
- Serb Svirskyi – bass guitar (till 2009)
- Oleksiy Dibrova – drums (2010)
- Vitaliy Vialyi – drums (2008 – 2009, 2011)
- Sashka Chech – violin (till 2011)
- Bohdan Shkurynskyi – accordion (till 2012)
- Alex Popel – drums (till 2012)
- Ivan Sopelniak – bass guitar (till 2012)
- Pavel Molukevich – bass guitar (2012)
- Taras Melnychenko – drums (2012–2013)
- Max Kortes – guitar (2011, 2013)

== Discography ==
- Strange World (EP, 2010)
- Maydan Birthday limited edition (2013)
