= Semenivka, Poltava Oblast =

Rural locality in Poltava Oblast, Ukraine

Semenivka Семéнівка
- Rural settlement

- Flag Coat of arms

- Location within Poltava Oblast Location within Ukraine
- Coordinates: 49°35′42″N 33°10′48″E
- Country: Ukraine
- Oblast: Poltava Oblast
- Raion: Kremenchuk Raion
- Founded: 1753

Area
  - Total: 10.7 km^{2} (4.1 sq mi)

Population (2022)
  - Total: 5,776
- Time zone: UTC+2 (EET)
  - Summer (DST): UTC+3 (EEST)
- Postcode district(s): 38200
- Area code: 5341

Semenivka (Ukrainian: Семéнівка) is a rural settlement in Poltava Oblast (province) of Ukraine. It was formerly the administrative center of Semenivka Raion, but now administrated within Kremenchuk Raion. Population: 5,776 (2022 estimate).

== History ==
Semenivka was founded in the 16th century on the place of horse post station. It was named after Semen Rodzianko.

Until 26 January 2024, Semenivka was designated urban-type settlement. On this day, a new law entered into force which abolished this status, and Semenivka became a rural settlement.

== Transport ==
Veselyi Podil railway station is located in Semenivka.

== Notable people ==
- Alex Benjamin Novikoff (1913–1987), biologist, born in Semenivka
