= Pyriatyn Raion =

Former subdivision of Poltava Oblast, Ukraine

Pyriatyn Raion Пирятинський район
- Raion
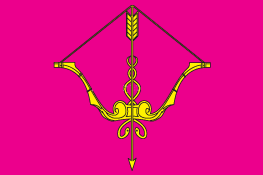
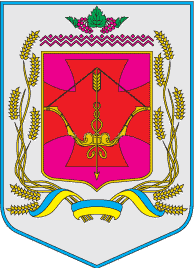
- Flag Coat of arms

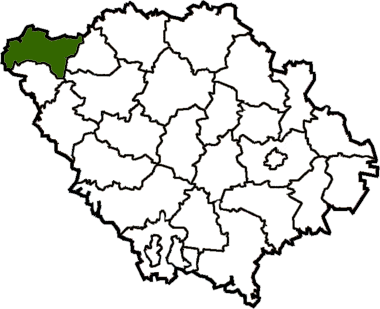
- Coordinates: 50°17′14.0814″N 32°26′58.5594″E
- Country: Ukraine
- Oblast: Poltava Oblast
- Established: 7 March 1923
- Disestablished: 18 July 2020
- Admin. center: Pyriatyn
- Subdivisions: List: — city councils; — settlement councils; — rural councils; Number of localities: — cities; — urban-type settlements; 42 — villages; — rural settlements

Government
  - Governor: Mykola Kupriyan

Area
  - Total: 863.5 km^{2} (333.4 sq mi)

Population (2020)
  - Total: 30,195
  - Density: 34.97/km^{2} (90.57/sq mi)
- Time zone: UTC+02:00 (EET)
  - Summer (DST): UTC+03:00 (EEST)
- Postal index: 37000—37053
- Area code: +380-5358
- Website: Official homepage

Pyriatyn Raion (Ukrainian: Пирятинський район) was a raion (district) in Poltava Oblast of central Ukraine. The raion's administrative center was the city of Pyriatyn. The raion was abolished and its territory was merged into Lubny Raion on 18 July 2020 as part of the administrative reform of Ukraine, which reduced the number of raions of Poltava Oblast to four. The last estimate of the raion population was 30,195 (2020 est.).
