= Kotelva =

Rural locality in Poltava Oblast, Ukraine

Kotelva Котельва
- Rural settlement
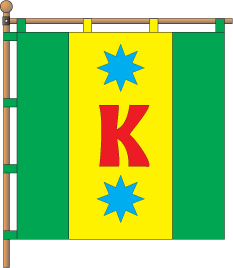
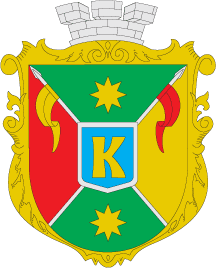
- Flag Coat of arms

- Location of Kotelva in Poltava Oblast Location of Kotelva in Ukraine
- Coordinates: 50°3′51.68″N 34°44′58.16″E
- Country: Ukraine
- Oblast: Poltava Oblast
- Raion: Poltava Raion
- Hromada: Kotelva settlement hromada
- Founded: 1582

Government
  - Head of city council: Ivan M. Harkvenko

Area
  - Total: 26.87 km^{2} (10.37 sq mi)
- Elevation: 102 m (335 ft)

Population (2022)
  - Total: 11,778
- Time zone: UTC+2 (EET)
  - Summer (DST): UTC+3 (EEST)
- Postal code: 38600
- Area code: 5350

Kotelva (Ukrainian: Котельва) is a rural settlement in Poltava Raion, Poltava Oblast, northeastern Ukraine. It hosts the administration of Kotelva settlement hromada, one of the hromadas of Ukraine. Population: 11,778 (2022 estimate).

== Location ==
Kotelva is in the northeastern area of forest on the left tributary of the Vorskla, the Kotelva. Kotelva is 66 km from Poltava on N12 and 35 km from the nearest train station.

== History ==
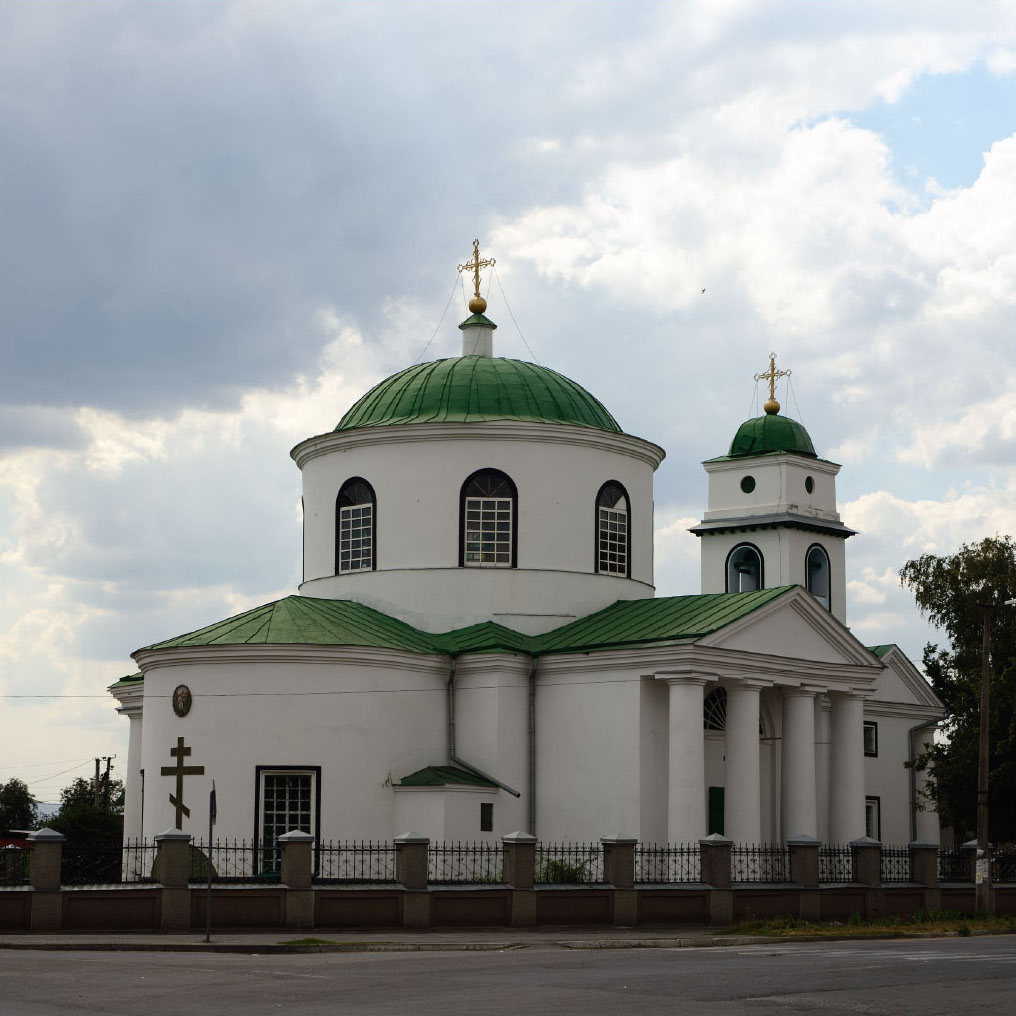
Holy Trinity Church

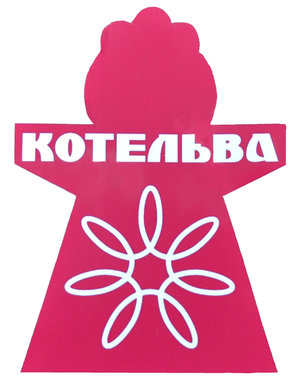
Symbol of the village of Kotelva

Two settlements of the Bandaryhynska culture dating back to the 12th and 10th centuries BC were found on the outskirts of Kotelva.

Kotelva was one of the earliest settlements of the Left-bank Hetmanate. The settlement emerged in the mid-16th century and in 1709 was temporarily included in Sloboda Ukraine. The emergence of a new settlement on the left bank laid its development in both the political and religious areas.

Kotelva was first mentioned in writing in 1582 when Hetman Skalozub told it about the attack of the Crimean state units. In 1638, inhabitants of the town first attacked against the Polish authorities in the army of Hetman Pivtorakozhuka. For ten years, during the Khmelnytsky Uprising, Kotelva inhabitants participated in battles under the leadership of Bohdan Khmelnytsky. In the second half of the 17th century and in the first half of the 18th century Kotelva was a fortress protecting against attacks of Crimean and Nogai troops. In January 1709, Charles XII of Sweden spared the city. Later deceit town came under the direct jurisdiction of Grand Duchy of Moscow and entered into the Okhtyrka regiment of Sloboda Ukraine. The church remained subordinate to the Kyiv Metropolis.

Subsequently, Kotelva rebuilt the castle in 1718. In 1722, the Okhtyrka Regiment was excluded from Kyiv province and went into the Military College. In the 1732 census, Kotelva had a population of 3,877.

In 1743, another census was held. Kotelva now had 8,433 inhabitants. The town was given a coat of arms. In 1812, the Holy Trinity Church, its largest architectural monument, was built.

With a population around 20,000, Kotelva was one of the largest villages in Ukraine until 1930. At the time it had a large cottage industry, mainly involved in weaving. In 1979, the town had a population of 12,000.

Until 18 July 2020, Kotelva was the administrative center of Kotelva Raion. The raion was abolished in July 2020 as part of the administrative reform of Ukraine, which reduced the number of raions of Poltava Oblast to four. The area of Kotelva Raion was merged into Poltava Raion.

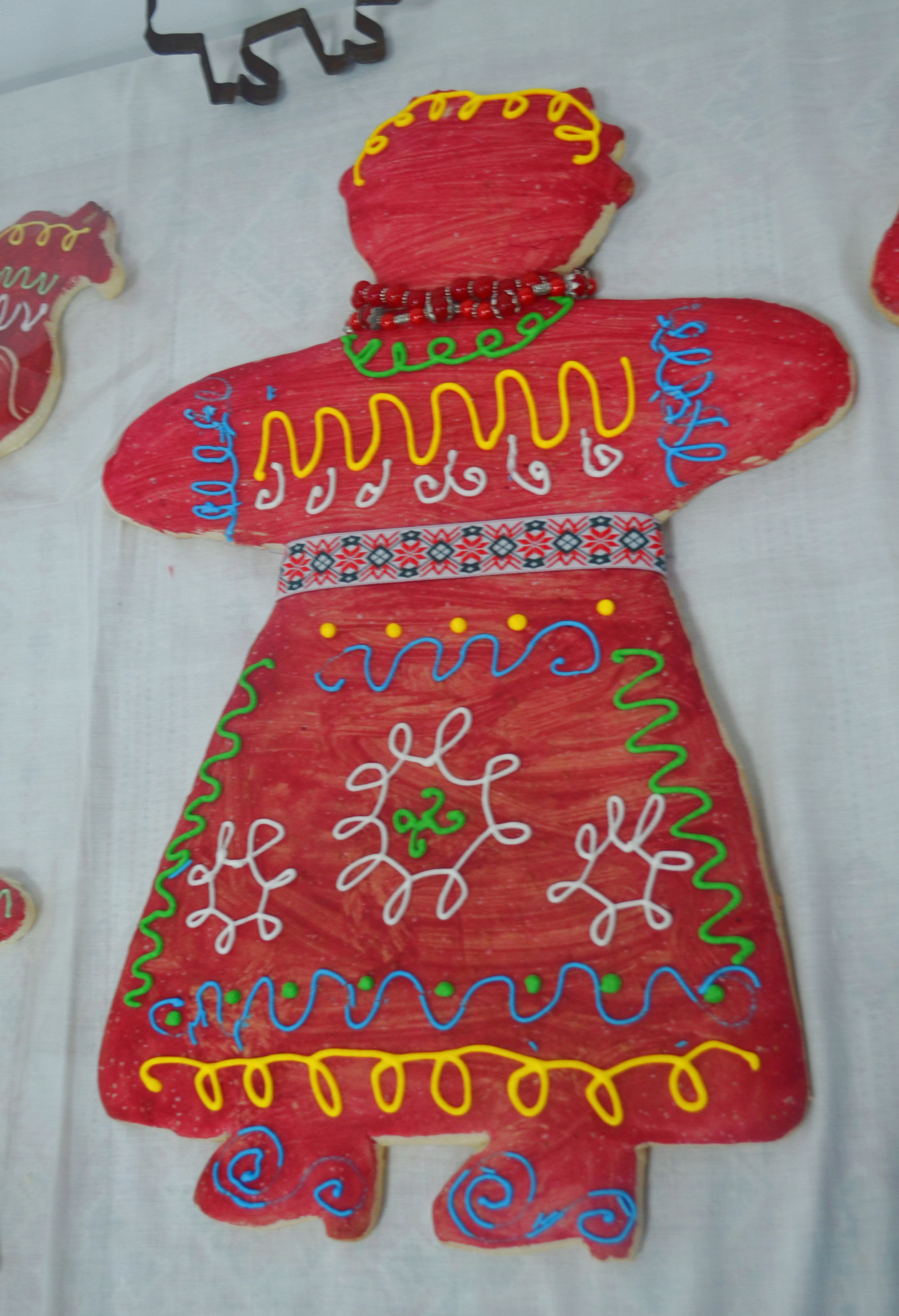
Kotelevsky "paniankа"

Until 26 January 2024, Kotelva was designated urban-type settlement. On this day, a new law entered into force which abolished this status, and Kotelva became a rural settlement.

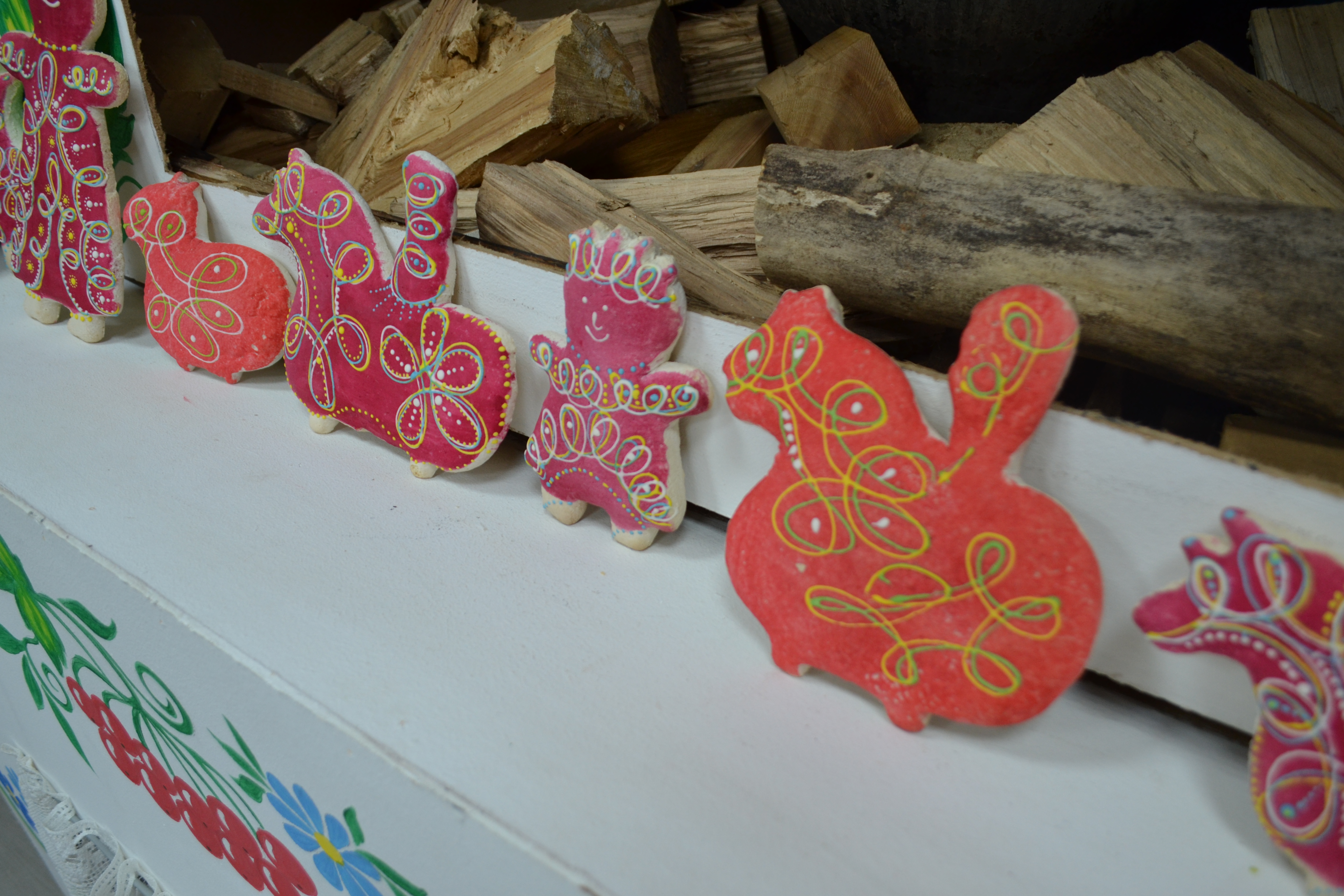
Kotelevsky "panianky"

== Intangible cultural heritage ==
In February 2025, the element “Folk tradition of baking Christmas ritual pastries ‘Panyanky’ in the Koteleve district” was added to the regional list of intangible cultural heritage of the Poltava region.

In July 2025, the tradition of baking and giving ceremonial Christmas gingerbread in the Slobozhanshchyna region was added to the list of intangible cultural heritage of Ukraine, which also included the tradition from Kotelva.

== Notable people ==
- Vladimir Burliuk
- Sydir Kovpak, partisan leader
- Valery Storozhik, actor
