= Dykanka Raion =

Former subdivision of Poltava Oblast, Ukraine

Dykanka Raion Диканський район
- Raion
- Flag Coat of arms

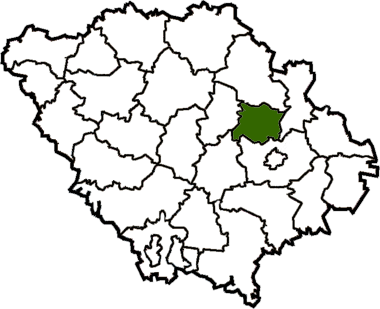
- Coordinates: 49°49′6.8808″N 34°25′28.0446″E
- Country: Ukraine
- Oblast: Poltava Oblast
- Established: 7 March 1923
- Disestablished: 18 July 2020
- Admin. center: Dykanka
- Subdivisions: List: — city councils; — settlement councils; — rural councils; Number of localities: — cities; — urban-type settlements; 58 — villages; — rural settlements

Government
  - Governor: Lyubov Lelyuk

Area
  - Total: 679 km^{2} (262 sq mi)

Population (2020)
  - Total: 18,118
  - Density: 26.7/km^{2} (69.1/sq mi)
- Time zone: UTC+02:00 (EET)
  - Summer (DST): UTC+03:00 (EEST)
- Area code: +380
- Website: Official homepage

Dykanka Raion (Ukrainian: Диканський район, romanized: Dykans'kyj rajon) was a raion (district) in Poltava Oblast in central Ukraine. The raion's administrative center was the urban-type settlement of Dykanka. The raion was abolished on 18 July 2020 as part of the administrative reform of Ukraine, which reduced the number of raions of Poltava Oblast to four. The area of Dykanka Raion was merged into Poltava Raion. The last estimate of the raion population was 18,118 (2020 est.)

At the time of disestablishment, the raion consisted of one hromada, Dykanka settlement hromada with the administration in Dykanka.

Important rivers within the Dykanka Raion included the Vorskla and the Orzhytsia rivers.

== Settlements ==
- Bayrak
- Dykanka
