= Shyshaky Raion =

Former subdivision of Poltava Oblast, Ukraine

Shyshaky Raion Шишацький район
- Raion
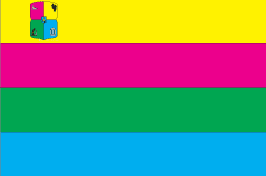
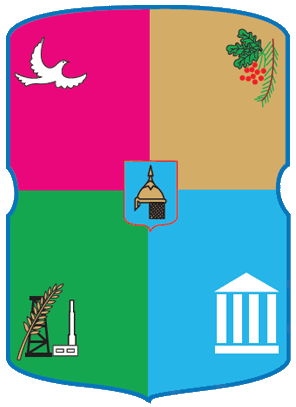
- Flag Coat of arms

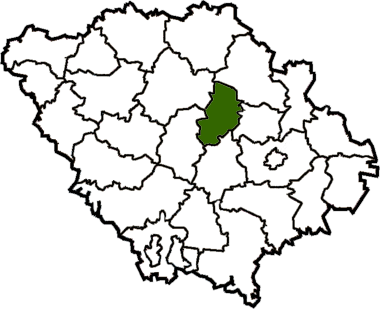
- Coordinates: 49°52′40.5948″N 34°3′51.5262″E
- Country: Ukraine
- Oblast: Poltava Oblast
- Established: 7 March 1923
- Disestablished: 18 July 2020
- Admin. center: Shyshaky
- Subdivisions: List: — city councils; — settlement councils; — rural councils; Number of localities: — cities; — urban-type settlements; 76 — villages; — rural settlements

Government
  - Governor: Vyacheslav Bilash

Area
  - Total: 790 km^{2} (310 sq mi)

Population (2020)
  - Total: 19,413
  - Density: 25/km^{2} (64/sq mi)
- Time zone: UTC+02:00 (EET)
  - Summer (DST): UTC+03:00 (EEST)
- Postal index: 38000—38043
- Area code: +380-5352
- Website: Official homepage

Shyshaky Raion (Ukrainian: Шишацький район) was a raion (district) in Poltava Oblast of central Ukraine. The raion's administrative center was the urban-type settlement of Shyshaky. The raion was abolished and its territory was merged into Myrhorod Raion on 18 July 2020 as part of the administrative reform of Ukraine, which reduced the number of raions of Poltava Oblast to four. The last estimate of the raion population was 19,413 (2015 est.)
