= Poltava Oblast =

Oblast (region) of Ukraine

Poltava Oblast Полтавська область
- Oblast
- Poltavska oblast
- Flag Coat of arms
- Nickname: Полтавщина (Poltavshchyna)
- Interactive map of Poltava Oblast in Ukraine
- Coordinates: 49°35′22″N 34°33′05″E
- Country: Ukraine
- Administrative center: Poltava

Government
  - Governor: Vitaliy Dyakivnych
  - Oblast council: 84 seats
  - Chairperson: Oleksandr Bilenky

Area
  - Total: 28,847 km^{2} (11,138 sq mi)
  - Rank: Ranked 6th

Population (2022)
  - Total: 1,352,283 ▼
  - Rank: Ranked 12th
  - Density: 46.878/km^{2} (121.41/sq mi)

GDP
  - Total: ₴ 267 billion (€6.9 billion)
  - Per capita: ₴ 195,825 (€5,100)
- Time zone: UTC+2 (EET)
  - Summer (DST): UTC+3 (EEST)
- Postal code: 36000-38999
- Area code: +380-53
- ISO 3166 code: UA-53
- Vehicle registration: ВІ, НІ
- Raions: 4
- Cities: 15
- HDI (2022): 0.727 high
- FIPS 10-4: UP18
- NUTS statistical regions of Ukraine: UA11
- Website: oblrada-pl.gov.ua

Poltava Oblast (Ukrainian: Полтавська область, romanized: Poltavska oblast), also referred to as Poltavshchyna (Ukrainian: Полтавщина), is an oblast (province) of central Ukraine. The administrative center of the oblast is the city of Poltava. Most of its territory was part of the southern regions of the Cossack Hetmanate. Population: 1,352,283 (2022 estimate).

After Poltava, the oblast's three most populous cities were Kremenchuk, Horishni Plavni, and Lubny, according to 2022 government estimates.

== History ==
The Poltava Oblast was established on 22 September 1937 by a resolution of the Central Executive Committee of the Soviet Union. It was based mostly on rayons (districts) that were part of Kharkiv Oblast, with some from Kyiv Oblast. The region approximately corresponds to the earlier Poltava Governorate (1802–1925).

During the Nazi Germany occupation in 1941–43, most of the region belonged to Kiew Generalbezirke (general district), while the rest was part of the German military rear area. After the withdrawal of German forces, the region was reinstated almost to the same borders. In the 1950s it lost some of its territories to the newly created Cherkasy Oblast. Some were submerged with the creation of the Kremenchuk Reservoir in 1959. In 2020, as part of a general Ukrainian administrative reform, Poltava Oblast reduced the number of its raions by increasing them in size.

During the Russian invasion of Ukraine, the town of Myrhorod was bombed. However, there has been no ground fighting and the province remains completely under Ukrainian control.

== Geography ==
Poltava Oblast is situated in the central part of Ukraine. Located on the left bank of the Dnieper, the Poltava region was part of the Cossack Hetmanate. It has an area of 28,800 km^{2}. The oblast borders Chernihiv, Sumy, Kharkiv, Dnipropetrovsk, Kirovohrad, Cherkasy and Kyiv oblasts. The oblast does not contain any notable landforms apart from the Dnieper river, the land is gently undulating.

== Demographics ==
According to the 2001 Ukrainian census, ethnic Ukrainians accounted for 91.4% of the population of Poltava Oblast, and ethnic Russians for 7.2%.

As of 2018, its population was 1,400,000 and population density was 49 people per 1 km^{2}.

=== Language ===
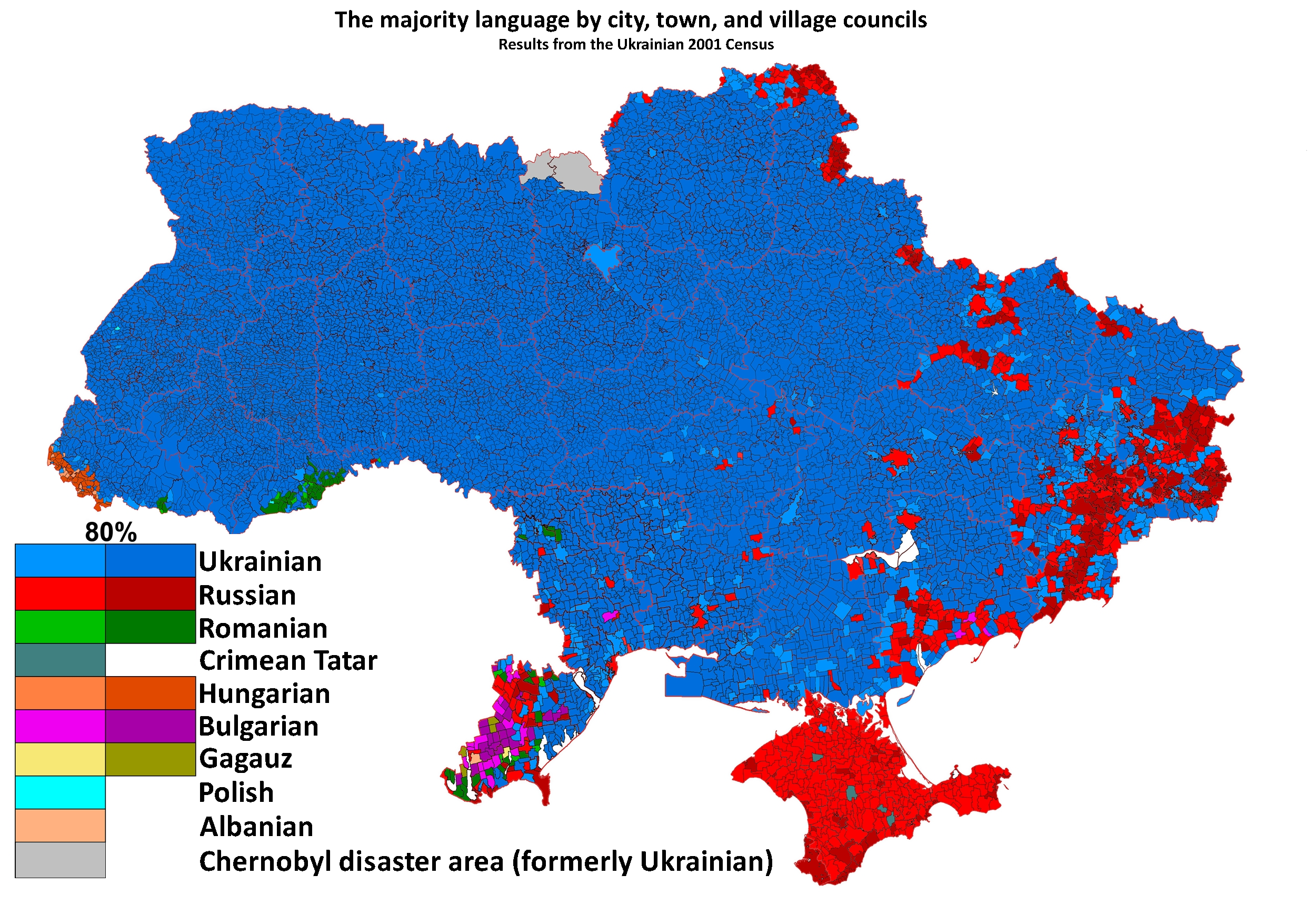
According to the 2001 Ukrainian census, Ukrainian was the native language for over 90% of Poltava Oblast's population: it was the dominant language in all of the city, town, and village councils of the oblast.

Due to the Russification of Ukraine during the Soviet era, the share of Ukrainian speakers in the population of Poltava Oblast gradually decreased, while the share of Russian speakers increased. Native language of the population of Poltava Oblast according to the results of population censuses:

	1959	1970	1989	2001
Ukrainian	92.1%	90.3%	85.9%	90.0%
Russian	7.2%	9.1%	13.2%	9.5%
Other	0.7%	0.6%	0.9%	0.5%

Native language of the population of the raions, cities and city councils of Poltava Oblast according to the 2001 Ukrainian census:

	Ukrainian	Russian
Poltava Oblast	90.0%	9.5%
City of Poltava	85.4%	14.1%
City of Kremenchuk	75.5%	23.9%
City of Lubny	91.1%	8.6%
City of Myrhorod	88.3%	11.3%
Komsomolsk (city council)	73.2%	26.3%
Velyka Bahachka Raion	96.7%	2.8%
Hadiach Raion	96.9%	2.8%
Hlobyne Raion	95.9%	3.4%
Hrebinka Raion	95.8%	3.6%
Dykanka Raion	95.3%	3.9%
Zinkiv Raion	97.0%	2.3%
Karlivka Raion	95.9%	3.4%
Kobeliaky Raion	96.0%	3.3%
Kozelshchyna Raion	96.0%	3.4%
Kotelva Raion	97.2%	2.4%
Kremenchuk Raion (in pre-2020 borders)	93.8%	5.6%
Lokhvytsia Raion	96.9%	2.7%
Lubny Raion (in pre-2020 borders)	97.5%	2.1%
Mashivka Raion	95.4%	3.9%
Myrhorod Raion (in pre-2020 borders)	97.5%	2.3%
Novi Sanzhary Raion	95.9%	3.4%
Orzhytsia Raion	97.5%	2.1%
Pyriatyn Raion	94.8%	4.8%
Poltava Raion (in pre-2020 borders)	93.8%	5.7%
Reshetylivka Raion	96.4%	2.7%
Semenivka Raion	97.3%	2.2%
Khorol Raion	97.3%	2.5%
Chornukhy Raion	97.9%	1.9%
Chutove Raion	95.2%	4.0%
Shyshaky Raion	96.7%	2.5%

Ukrainian is the only official language on the whole territory of Poltava Oblast.

According to a poll conducted by Rating from 16 November to 10 December 2018 as part of the project «Portraits of Regions», 80% of the residents of Poltava Oblast believed that the Ukrainian language should be the only state language on the entire territory of Ukraine. 9% believed that Ukrainian should be the only state language, while Russian should be the second official language in some regions of the country. 8% believed that Russian should become the second state language of the country. 3% found it difficult to answer.

On 3 December 2024, Poltava Oblast Council approved the «Programme for the Development and Functioning of the Ukrainian Language as the State Language in All Spheres of Public Life in Poltava Oblast for 2025—2030», the main objectives of which are to strengthen the positions of the Ukrainian language in various spheres of public life in the oblast and to Ukrainianize the refugees from other regions of Ukraine.

According to the research of the Content Analysis Centre, conducted from 15 August to 15 September 2024, the topic of which was the ratio of Ukrainian and Russian languages in the Ukrainian segment of social media, 76.0% of posts from Poltava Oblast were written in Ukrainian (63.9% in 2023, 60.0% in 2022, 15.5% in 2020), while 24.0% were written in Russian (36.1% in 2023, 40.0% in 2022, 84.5% in 2020).

After Ukraine declared independence in 1991, Poltava Oblast, as well as Ukraine as a whole, experienced a gradual Ukrainization of the education system, which had been Russified during the Soviet era. Dynamics of the ratio of the languages of instruction in general secondary education institutions in Poltava Oblast:

Language of instruction, % of pupils	1991— 1992	1992— 1993	1993— 1994	1994— 1995	1995— 1996	2000— 2001	2005— 2006	2007— 2008	2010— 2011	2012— 2013	2015— 2016	2018— 2019	2021— 2022	2022— 2023
Ukrainian	74.3%	74.4%	77.5%	80.6%	83.0%	93.0%	97.0%	97.0%	98.0%	98.0%	99.0%	99.0%	99.96%	100.0%
Russian	25.7%	25.6%	22.5%	19.4%	17.0%	7.0%	3.0%	3.0%	2.0%	2.0%	1.0%	1.0%	0.04%	—

According to the State Statistics Service of Ukraine, in the 2023—2024 school year, all 134,575 pupils in general secondary education institutions in Poltava Oblast were studying in classes where Ukrainian was the language of instruction.

=== Age structure ===
0–14 years: 13.2% ▲ (male 99,444/female 93,949)
15–64 years: 69.9% (male 483,389/female 530,911)
65 years and over: 16.9% ▼ (male 81,435/female 164,861) (2013 official)

=== Median age ===
total: 41.4 years ▲
male: 38.0 years ▲
female: 44.7 years ▲ (2013 official)

== Points of interest ==
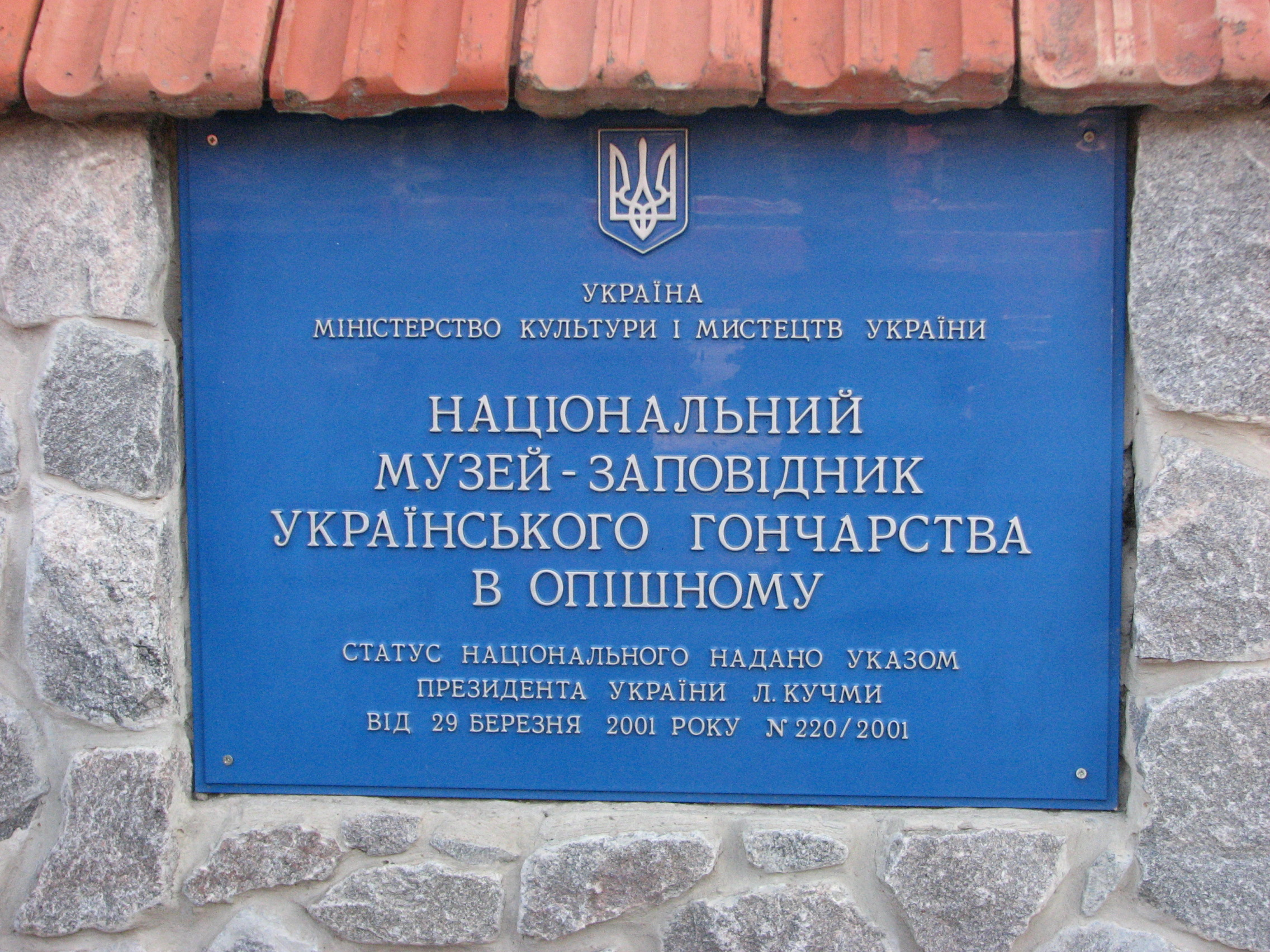
National Museum of Ukrainian Pottery in Opishnia

The following historic-cultural sites were nominated for the Seven Wonders of Ukraine:

- Gogol Museum-Reserve
- Kotliarevsky Museum and Manor
- Saint Nicholas Church
- Poltava Museum of Local Lore
- Exaltation of the Holy Cross Monastery

Other points of interest include the site of the Battle of Poltava and the Bilsk hillfort. Opishnia is a centre for the production of decorative ceramics and is the location of the National Museum-Reserve of Ukrainian Pottery.

== Economy ==
=== Industry ===
The oblast is a center of Ukraine's oil and natural gas industry, with many wells and pipelines situated here. There is a major oil refinery plant in the city of Kremenchuk. Important iron ore processing facilities also present. In general, there are 374 large industrial organization and 618 small industrial organizations.

=== Agriculture ===
In 1999 the gross grain yield was about 14,529 thousand tons, sugar beets – 1,002,900 tons, sunflower seeds – 166,200 tons, potatoes – 279,900 tons. The oblast also produced 120,500 tons of meat, 645,900 tons of milk and 423,200,00 eggs. At the beginning of 1999 there were 1,311 registered farms in the region.

== Administrative divisions ==
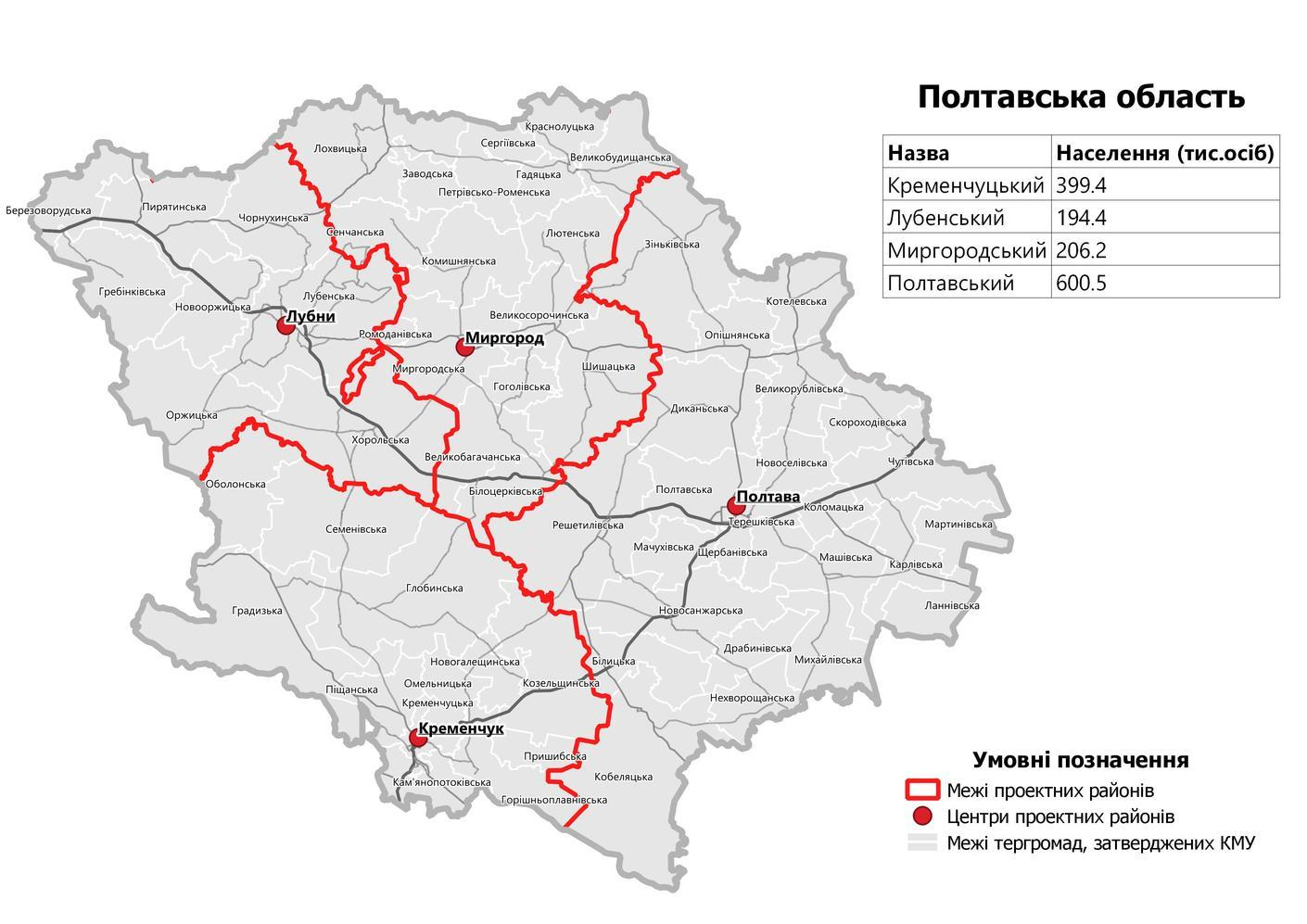
Raions of Poltava Oblast as of August 2020.

The oblast is divided into 4 districts and 60 hromadas.

The local administration of the oblast is controlled by the Poltava Oblast Rada. The governor of the oblast is the Poltava Oblast Rada speaker, appointed by the President of Ukraine.

The following data incorporates the number of each type of administrative divisions of the Poltava Oblast:

- Administrative centre – 1 (Poltava)
- Raions – 4
  - Hromadas – 60

On 18 July 2020, the number of raions was reduced to four. These are:

1. Kremenchuk Raion (Кременчуцький район), the center is in the city of Kremenchuk;
2. Lubny Raion (Лубенський район), the center is in the city of Lubny;
3. Myrhorod Raion (Миргородський район), the center is in the city of Myrhorod;
4. Poltava Raion (Полтавський район), the center is in the city of Poltava.

=== Until 2020 ===
Name	Ukrainian name	Area (km^{2})	Population census 2015	Admin. center	Urban population
Poltava	Полта́ва (місто)	103	293,945	Poltava (city)	293,945
Horishni Plavni	Горішні Плавні (місто)	34	54,701	Horishni Plavni (city)	52,144
Kremenchuk	Кременчу́к (місто)	96	223,942	Kremenchuk (city)	223,942
Lubny	Лубни (місто)	46	46,820	Lubny (city)	46,820
Myrhorod	Миргород (місто)	20	40,440	Myrhorod (city)	40,440
Chornukhy Raion	Чорнухинський район	682	11,485	Chornukhy	2,581
Chutove Raion	Чутівський район	861	22,976	Chutove	9,468
Dykanka Raion	Диканський район	679	18,993	Dykanka	7,804
Hadiach Raion	Гадяцький район	1,595	29,767	Hadiach	24,005
Hlobyne Raion	Глобинський район	2,500	44,007	Hlobyne	16,182
Hrebinka Raion	Гребінківський район	595	22,589	Hrebinka	10,926
Karlivka Raion	Карлівський район	854	34,121	Karlivka	14,997
Khorol Raion	Хорольський район	1,062	34,670	Khorol	13,304
Kobeliaky Raion	Кобеляцький район	1,823	42,419	Kobeliaky	14,982
Kotelva Raion	Котелевський район	800	19,674	Kotelva	12,406
Kozelshchyna Raion	Козельщинський район	930	19,575	Kozelshchyna	5,981
Kremenchuk Raion	Кременчуцький район	1,200	39,699	Kremenchuk (city)	N/A *
Lokhvytsia Raion	Лохвицький район	1,300	43,274	Lokhvytsia	20,187
Lubny Raion	Лубенський район	1,378	31,983	Lubny (city)	N/A *
Mashivka Raion	Машівський район	889	19,609	Mashivka	3,815
Myrhorod Raion	Миргородський район	1,540	32,115	Myrhorod (city)	N/A *
Novi Sanzhary Raion	Новосанжарський район	1,300	34,620	Novi Sanzhary	8,375
Orzhytsia Raion	Оржицький район	1,000	24228	Orzhytsia	5,369
Poltava Raion	Полтавський район	1,259	67,095	Poltava (city)	N/A *
Pyriatyn Raion	Пирятинський район	864	31,809	Pyriatyn	15,796
Reshetylivka Raion	Решетилівський район	1,009	26,399	Reshetylivka	9,340
Semenivka Raion	Семенівський район	1,300	25,456	Semenivka	6,244
Shyshaky Raion	Шишацький район	790	20,423	Shyshaky	4,545
Velyka Bahachka Raion	Великобагачанський район	1,000	25,145	Velyka Bahachka	8,350
Zinkiv Raion	Зіньківський район	1,360	34,700	Zinkiv	15,179

Note: Asterisks (*) Though the administrative center of the raion is housed in the city that it is named after, cities do not answer to the raion authorities only towns do; instead they are directly subordinated to the oblast government and therefore are not counted as part of raion statistics.

== Nomenclature ==
Most of Ukraine's oblasts are named after their capital cities, officially referred to as "oblast centers" (Ukrainian: обласний центр, translit. oblasnyi tsentr). The name of each oblast is a relative adjective, formed by adding a feminine suffix to the name of respective center city: Poltava is the center of the Poltavs'ka oblast' (Poltava Oblast). Most oblasts are also sometimes referred to in a feminine noun form, following the convention of traditional regional place names, ending with the suffix "-shchyna", as is the case with the Poltava Oblast, Poltavshchyna.

== Gallery ==
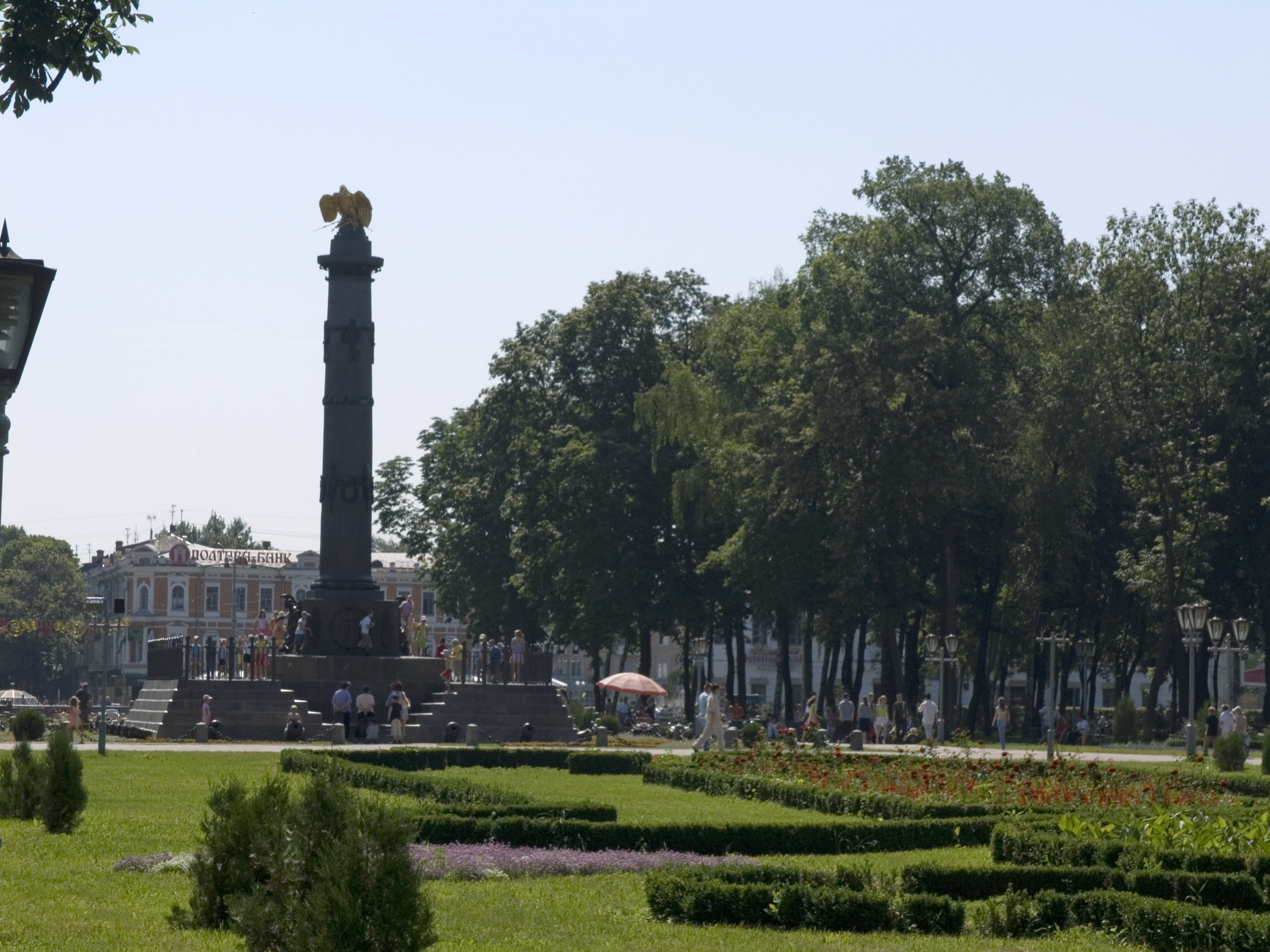
Corpus garden

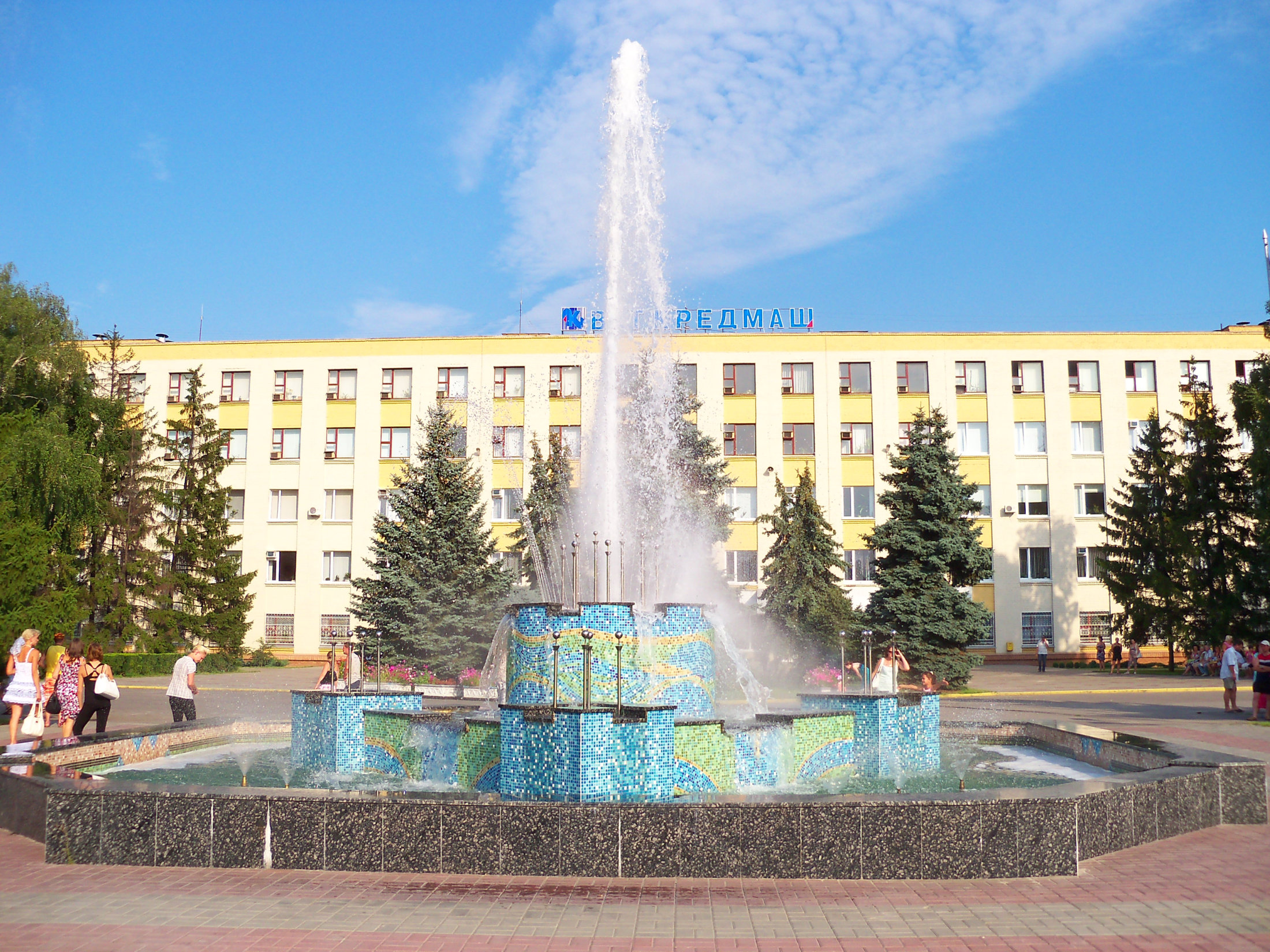
Kremenchuk

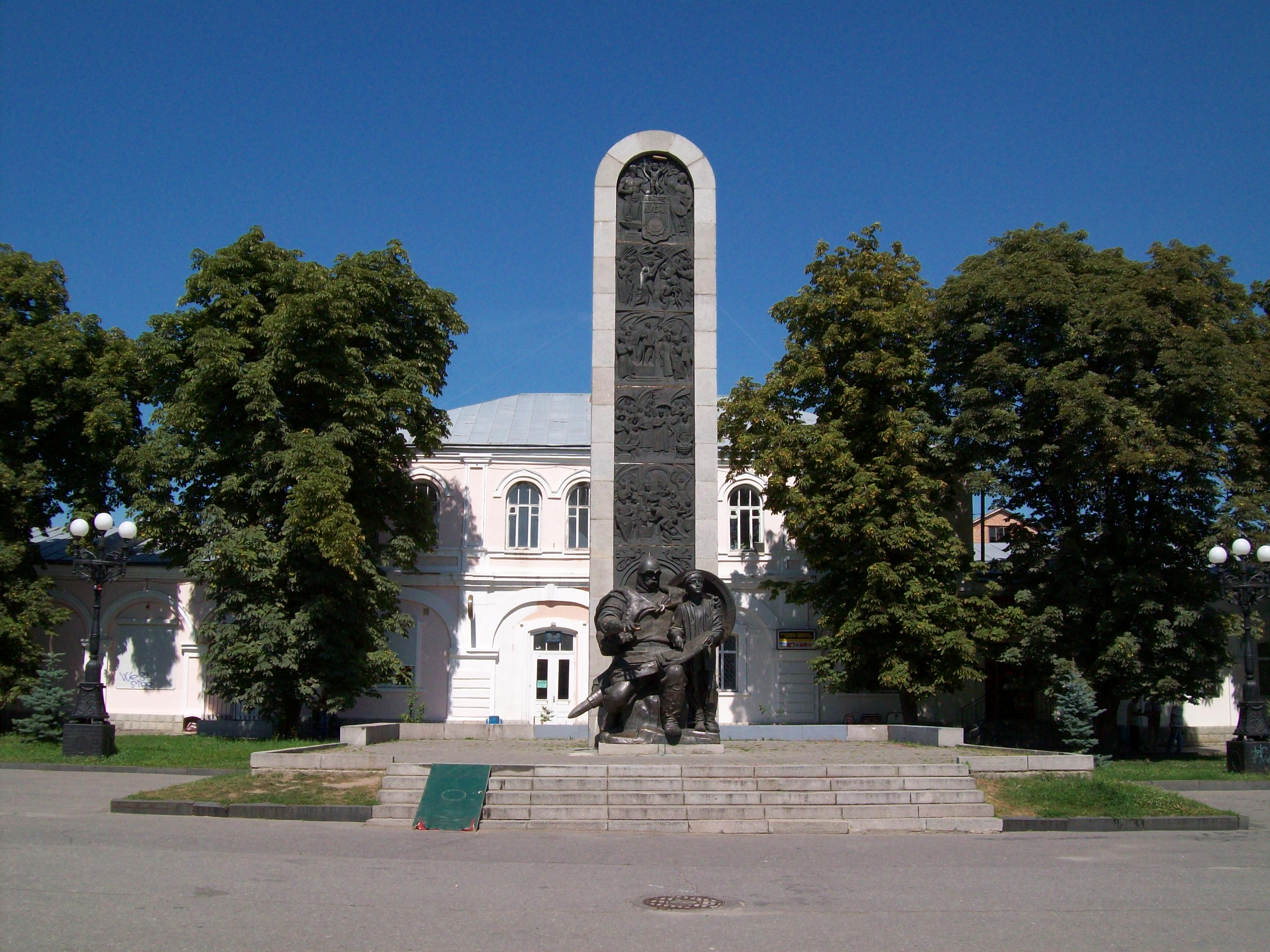
Lubny

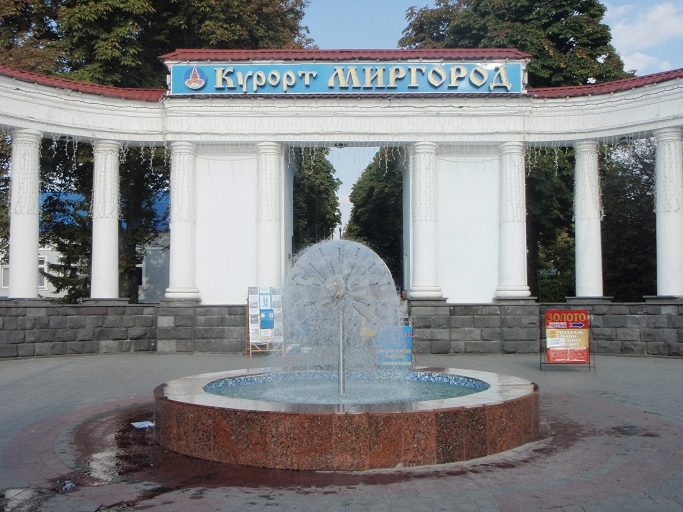
Myrhorod

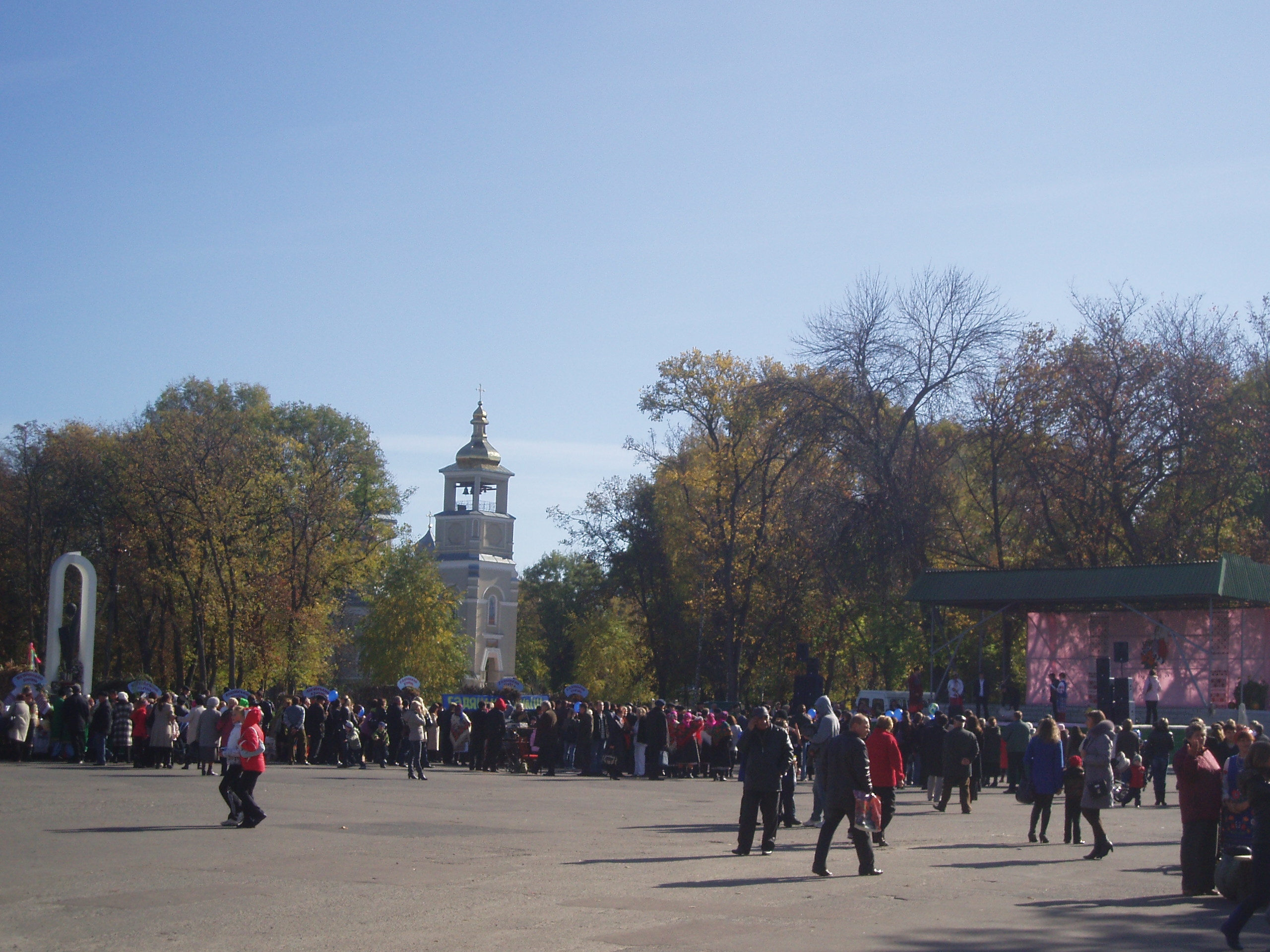
Hadiach

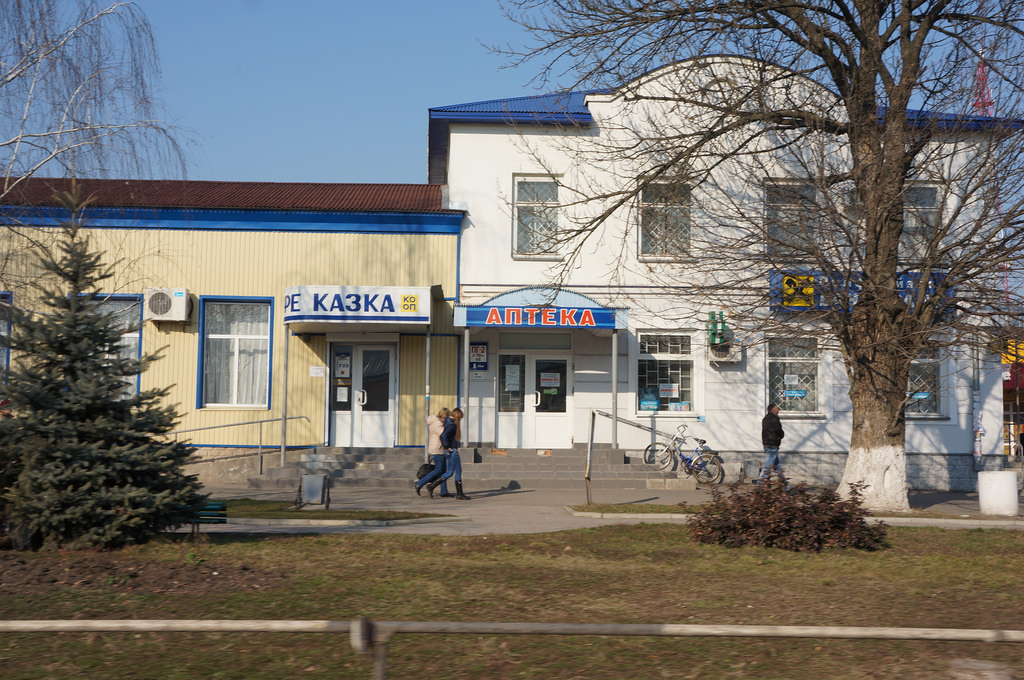
Karlivka

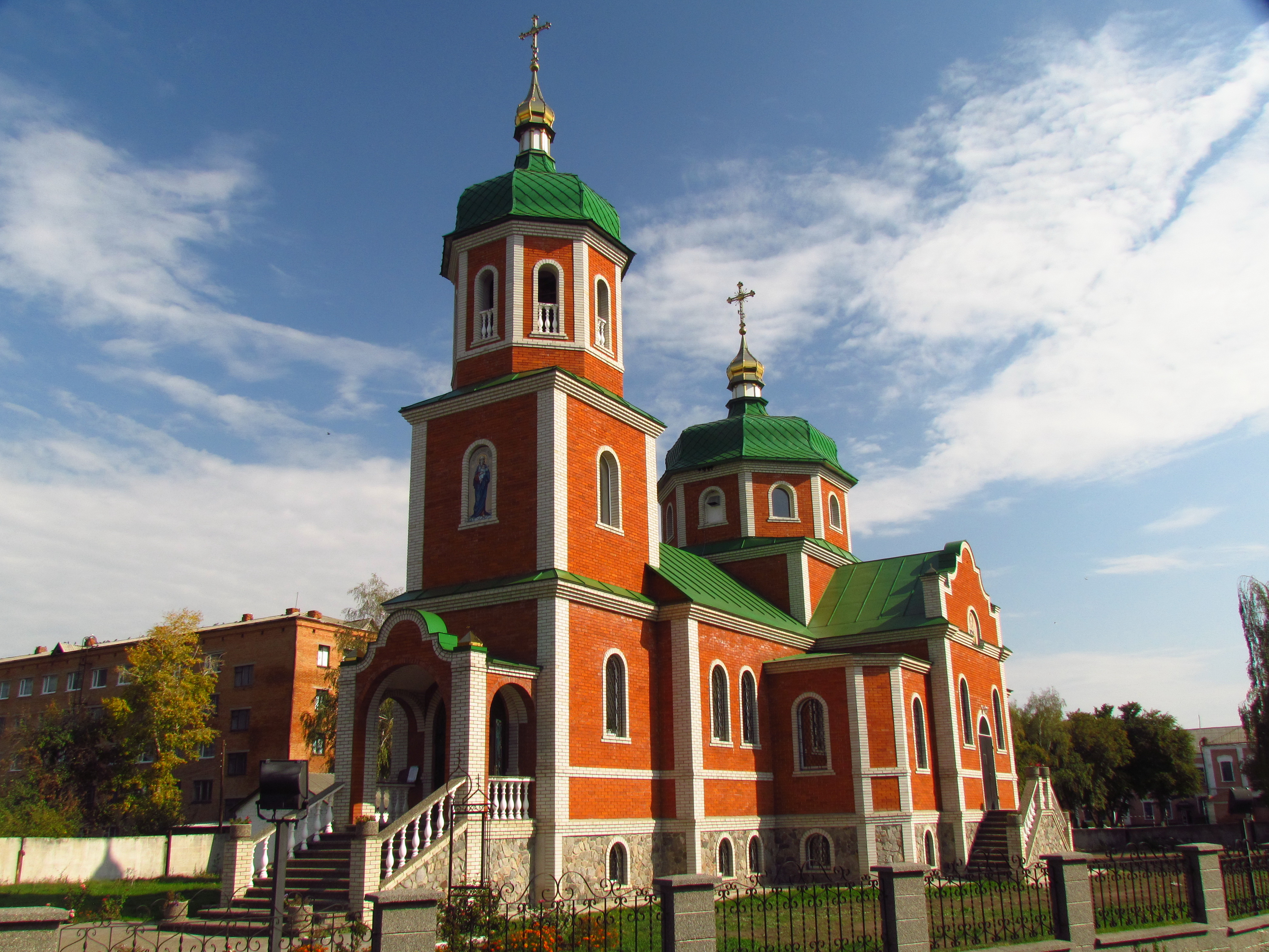
Khorol

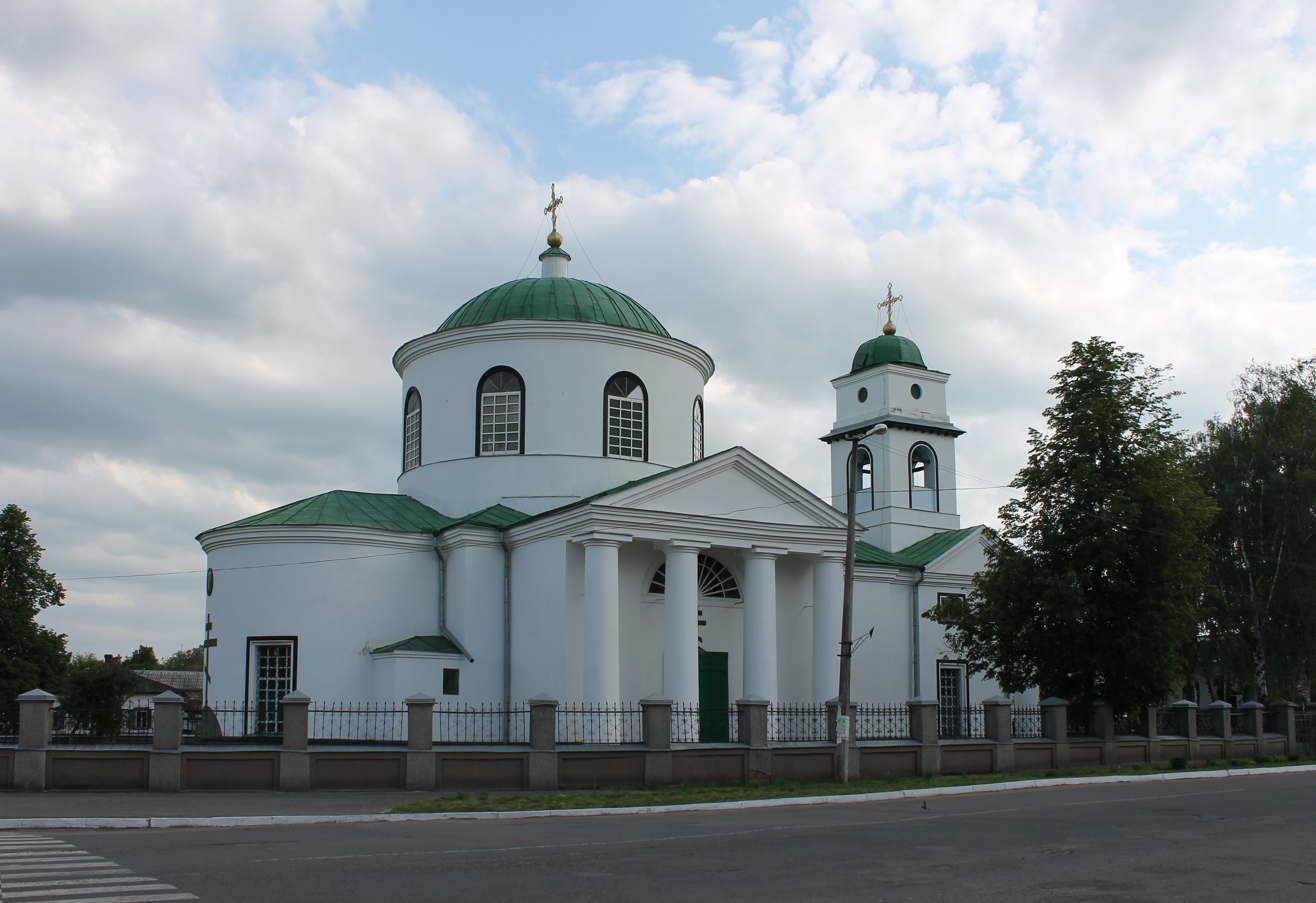
Kotelva

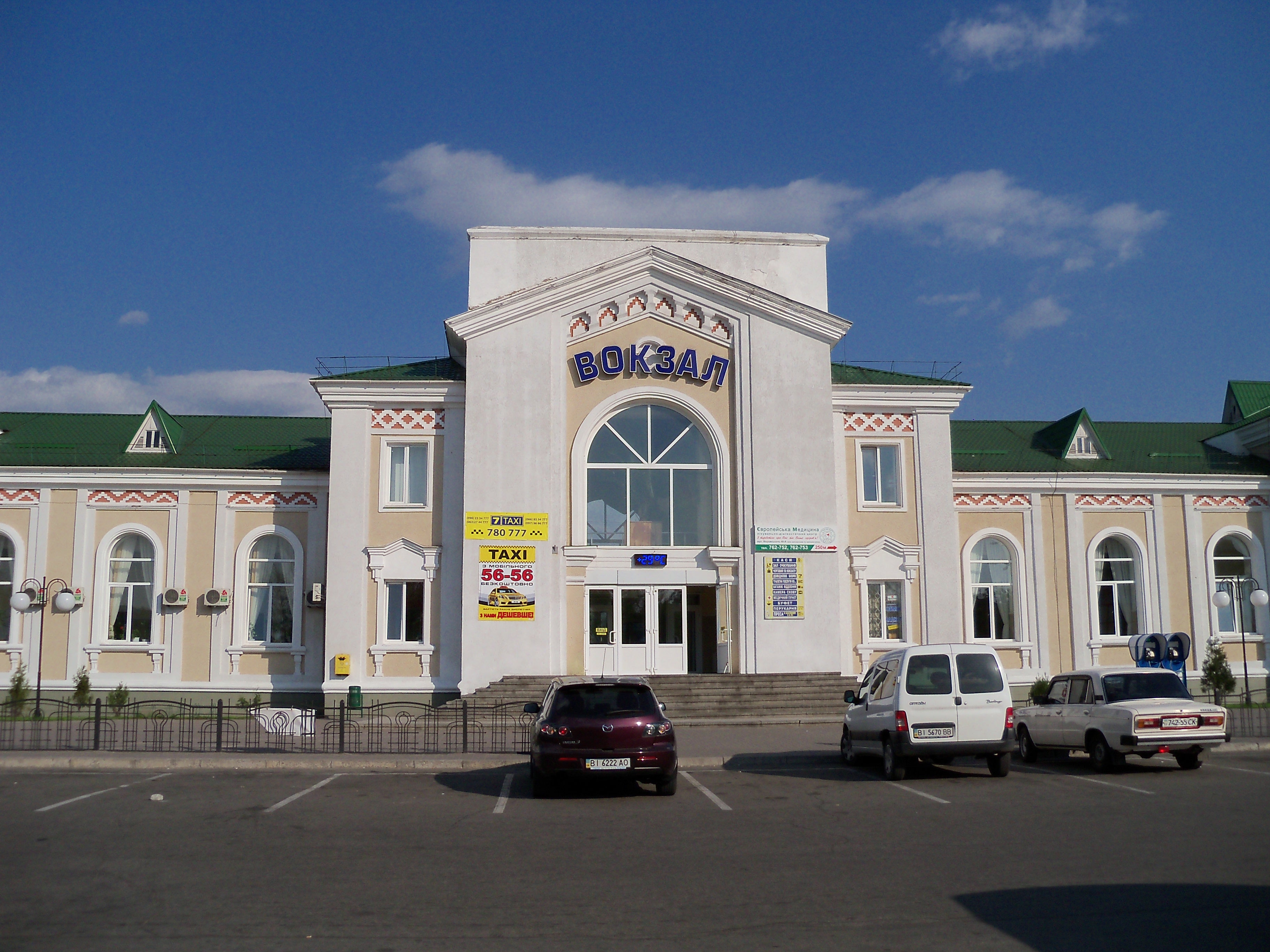
Railway station in Kremenchuk

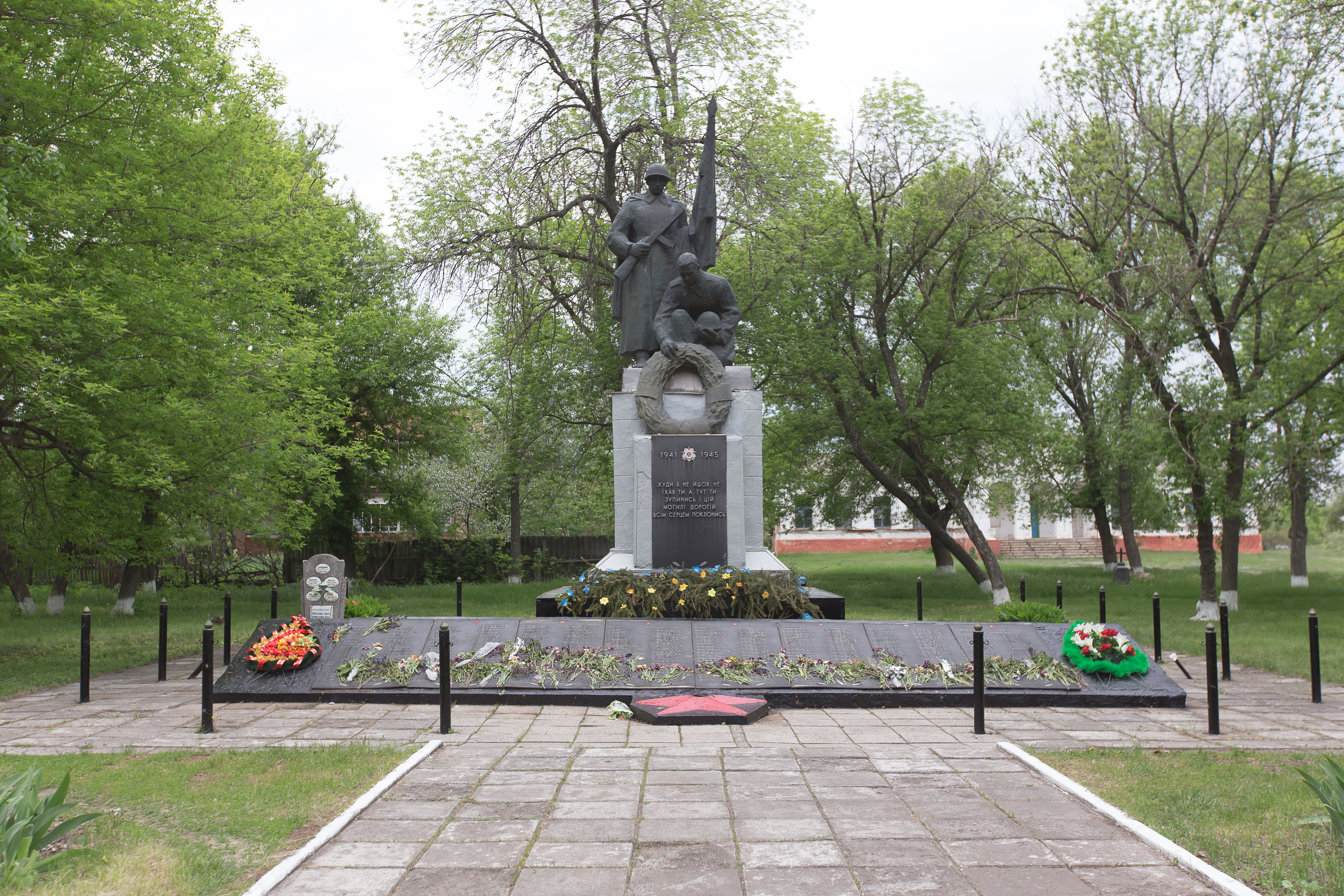
Monument to those killed in the Second World War

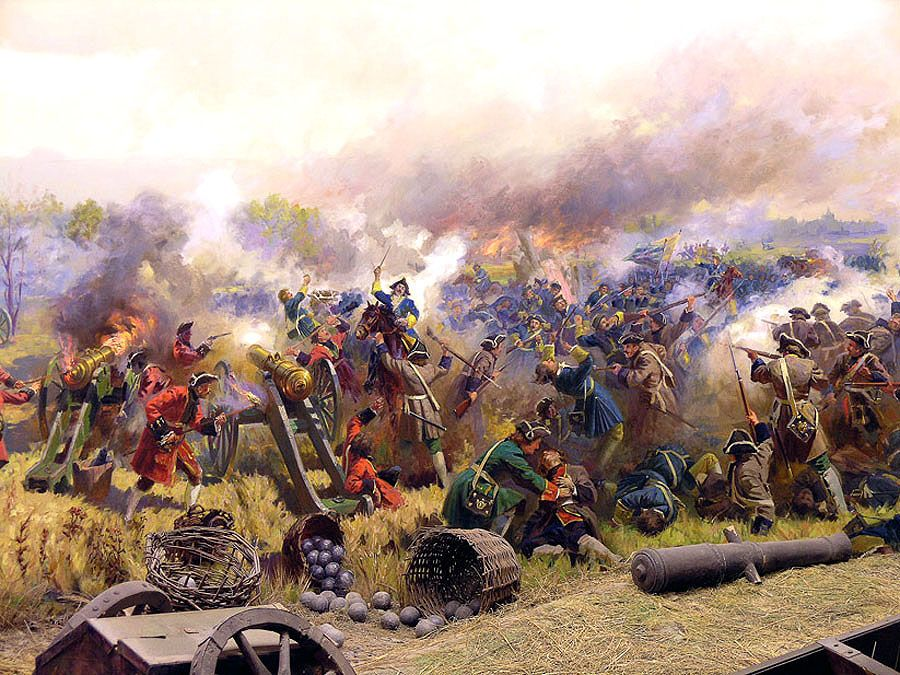
Detail of Diorama of Battle of Poltava

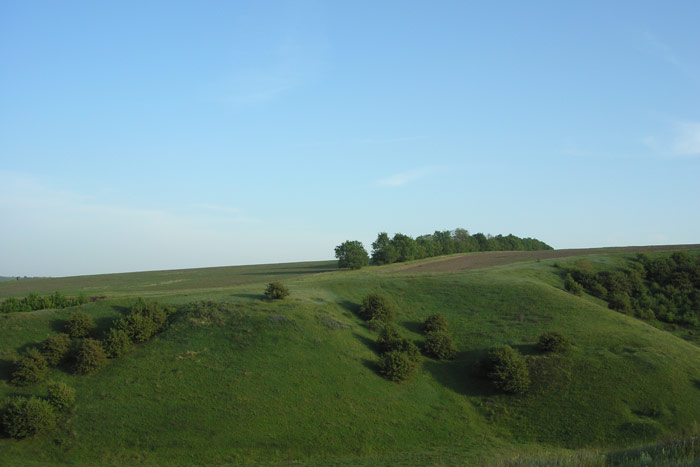
Deivka
