= Veselyi Podil railway station =

Railway station in Ukraine

Veselyi Podil Веселий Поділ
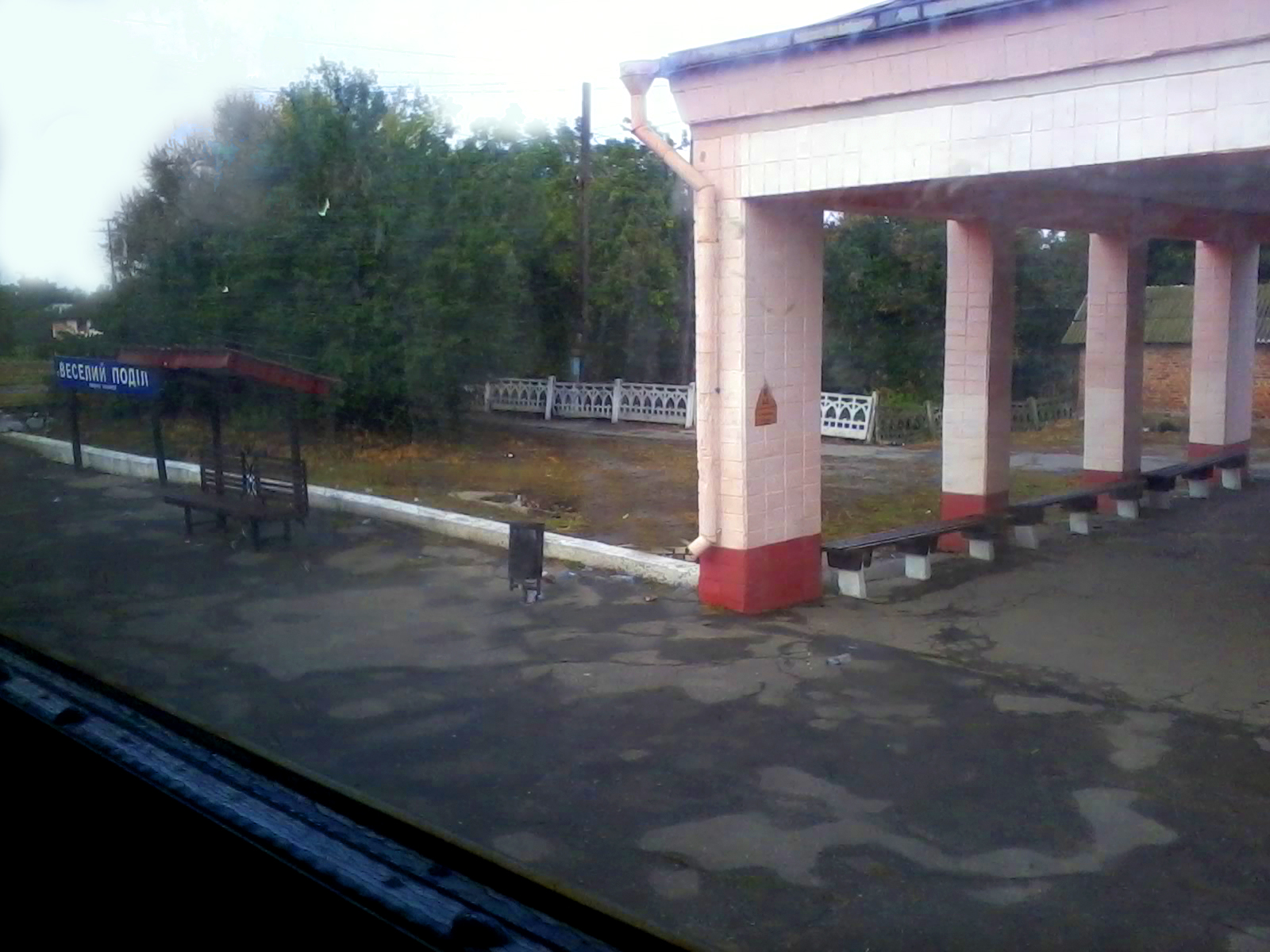

General information
- Location: Lenina St 21A, Semenivka, Ukraine
- Coordinates: 49°36′11.5″N 33°11′15.6″E
- System: Southern Railway terminal
- Owner: Ukrzaliznytsia
- Platforms: 1
- Tracks: 4

Construction
- Parking: Yes

History
- Opened: 1887
Location

Veselyi Podil (Ukrainian: Веселий Поділ) is a railway station in Semenivka, Poltava Oblast.

== See also ==
- Ukrzaliznytsia - the national railway company of Ukraine
