= Shyshaky =

Rural locality in Poltava Oblast, Ukraine

Shyshaky Шишаки
- Rural settlement
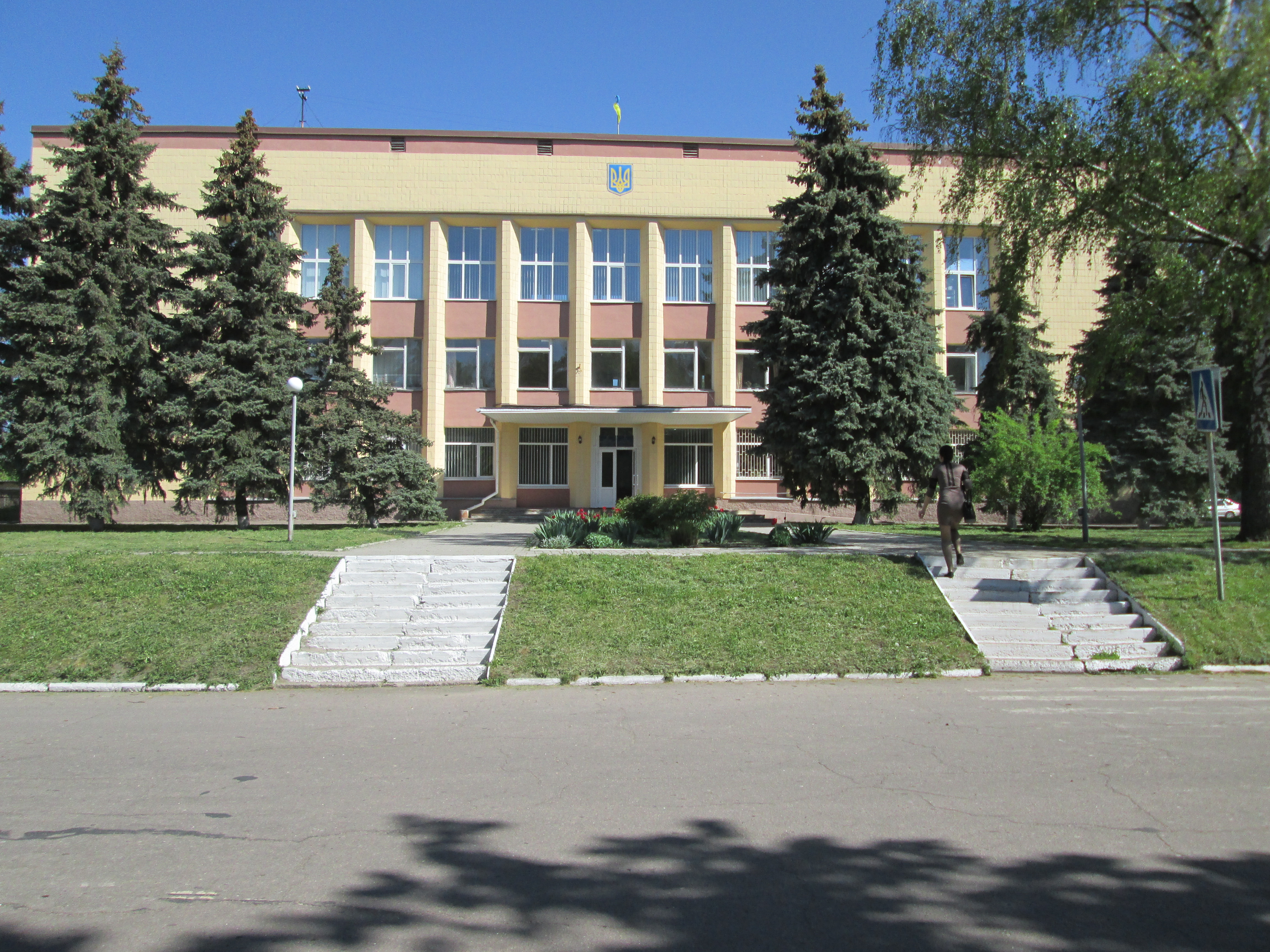
- Shyshaky Raion administrative seat

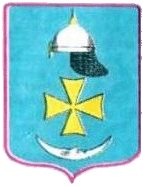
- Coat of arms

- Location in Poltava Oblast Location in Ukraine
- Country: Ukraine
- Oblast: Poltava Oblast
- Raion: Myrhorod Raion

Population (2022)
  - Total: 4,242
- Time zone: UTC+2 (EET)
  - Summer (DST): UTC+3 (EEST)

Shyshaky (Ukrainian: Шишаки; Russian: Шишаки) is a rural settlement in Poltava Oblast, Ukraine. It was formerly the administrative center of Shyshaky Raion until 2020, but now administrated within Myrhorod Raion. Shyshaky hosts the administration of Shyshaky settlement hromada, one of the hromadas of Ukraine. It is located on the left bank of the Psel, a left tributary of the Dnieper. Population: 4,242 (2022 estimate).

== History ==
In the 19th century, Shyshaky was part of Shyshaky volost, Mirgorodsky Uyezd, Poltava Governorate.

Until 26 January 2024, Shyshaky was designated as an urban-type settlement. Also on that day, a new law entered into force which abolished this status, and Shyshaky became a rural settlement.

== Economy ==
=== Transportation ===
The settlement has access to the Highway M03, connecting it to Kyiv and Kharkiv via Poltava. It also has access to Velyki Sorochyntsi and Myrhorod.

The closest railway station, Yareski, iz about 10 kilometres (6.2 mi) southwest of Shyshaky and on the railway line connecting Poltava and Romodan via Myrhorod. There is both local and long-distance passenger traffic.
