= Kotelva Raion =

Former subdivision of Poltava Oblast, Ukraine

Kotelva Raion Котелевський район
- Raion
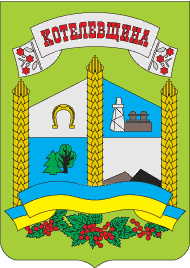
- Flag Coat of arms

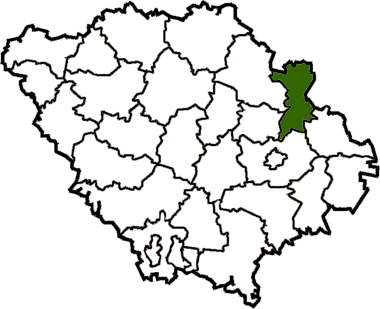
- Coordinates: 49°58′3.0684″N 34°46′40.1118″E
- Country: Ukraine
- Oblast: Poltava Oblast
- Established: 7 March 1923
- Disestablished: 18 July 2020
- Admin. center: Kotelva
- Subdivisions: List: — city councils; — settlement councils; — rural councils; Number of localities: — cities; — urban-type settlements; 38 — villages; — rural settlements

Government
  - Governor: Tetyana Korost

Area
  - Total: 800 km^{2} (310 sq mi)

Population (2020)
  - Total: 18,950
  - Density: 24/km^{2} (61/sq mi)
- Time zone: UTC+02:00 (EET)
  - Summer (DST): UTC+03:00 (EEST)
- Postal index: індекси: 38600—38633
- Area code: +380-5350
- Website: Official homepage

Kotelva Raion (Ukrainian: Котелевський район) was a raion (district) in Poltava Oblast in central Ukraine. The raion's administrative center was the urban-type settlement of Kotelva. The raion was abolished and its territory was merged into Poltava Raion on 18 July 2020 as part of the administrative reform of Ukraine, which reduced the number of raions of Poltava Oblast to four. The last estimate of the raion population was 18,950 (2020 est.)

At the time of disestablishment, the raion consisted of two hromadas:

- Kotelva settlement hromada with the administration in Kotelva;
- Velyka Rublivka rural hromada with the administration in the selo of Velyka Rublivka.
