= Mashivka =

Rural locality in Poltava Oblast, Ukraine

Mashivka Машівка
- Rural settlement
- Location in Poltava Oblast Location in Ukraine
- Country: Ukraine
- Oblast: Poltava Oblast
- Raion: Poltava Raion

Population (2022)
  - Total: 3,548
- Time zone: UTC+2 (EET)
  - Summer (DST): UTC+3 (EEST)

Mashivka (Ukrainian: Машівка; Russian: Машевка) is a rural settlement in Poltava Raion of Poltava Oblast, northeastern Ukraine. The settlement is located on the left bank of the Tahamlyk, a tributary of the Vorskla in the drainage basin of the Dnieper. It hosts the administration of Mashivka settlement hromada, one of the hromadas of Ukraine. Population: 3,548 (2022 estimate).

== History ==
Until 18 July 2020, Mashivka was the administrative center of Mashivka Raion. The raion was abolished in July 2020 as part of the administrative reform of Ukraine, which reduced the number of raions of Poltava Oblast to four. The area of Mashivka Raion was merged into Poltava Raion.

Until 26 January 2024, Mashivka was designated urban-type settlement. On this day, a new law entered into force which abolished this status, and Mashivka became a rural settlement.

== Economy ==
=== Transportation ===
The settlement has road access to Poltava and Krasnohrad, with further access via highways to Kharkiv and Dnipro.

Mashivka railway station is on the railway connecting Poltava and Krasnohrad. There is infrequent passenger traffic.
