= Mashivka Raion =

Former subdivision of Poltava Oblast, Ukraine

Mashivka Raion Машівський район
- Raion
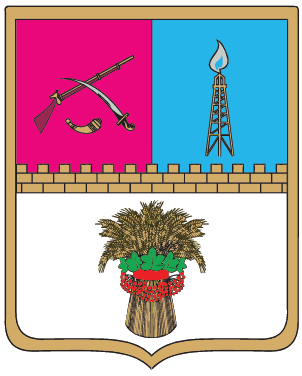
- Flag Coat of arms

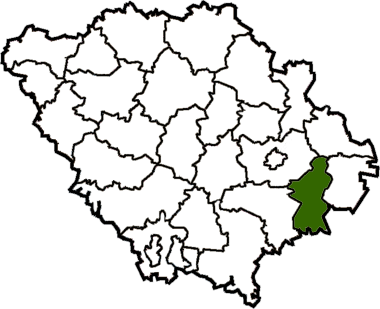
- Coordinates: 49°22′23.253″N 34°52′30.252″E
- Country: Ukraine
- Oblast: Poltava Oblast
- Established: 7 March 1923
- Disestablished: 18 July 2020
- Admin. center: Mashivka
- Subdivisions: List: — city councils; — settlement councils; — rural councils; Number of localities: — cities; — urban-type settlements; 39 — villages; — rural settlements

Government
  - Governor: Oleksandr Bondarenko

Area
  - Total: 889 km^{2} (343 sq mi)

Population (2020)
  - Total: 18,686
  - Density: 21.0/km^{2} (54.4/sq mi)
- Time zone: UTC+02:00 (EET)
  - Summer (DST): UTC+03:00 (EEST)
- Postal index: 39400—39453
- Area code: +380-5364
- Website: Official homepage

Mashivka Raion (Ukrainian: Машівський район) was a raion (district) in Poltava Oblast in central Ukraine. The raion's administrative center was the urban-type settlement of Mashivka. The raion was abolished and its territory was merged into Poltava Raion on 18 July 2020 as part of the administrative reform of Ukraine, which reduced the number of raions of Poltava Oblast to four. The last estimate of the raion population was 18,686 (2020 est.)

At the time of disestablishment, the raion consisted of two hromadas:

- Mashivka settlement hromada with the administration in Mashivka;
- Mykhailivka rural hromada with the administration in the village of Mykhailivka.
