= Semenivka Raion, Poltava Oblast =

Former subdivision of Poltava Oblast, Ukraine

Semenivka Raion Семенівський район
- Raion
- Flag Coat of arms

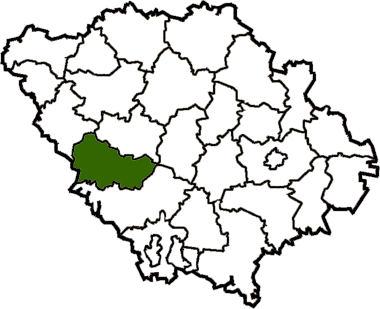
- Coordinates: 49°36′26.6106″N 33°2′42.8532″E
- Country: Ukraine
- Oblast: Poltava Oblast
- Established: 7 March 1923
- Disestablished: 18 July 2020
- Admin. center: Semenivka
- Subdivisions: List: — city councils; — settlement councils; — rural councils; Number of localities: — cities; — urban-type settlements; 64 — villages; — rural settlements

Government
  - Governor: Valeriy Knysh

Area
  - Total: 1,300 km^{2} (500 sq mi)

Population (2020)
  - Total: 23,722
  - Density: 18/km^{2} (47/sq mi)
- Time zone: UTC+02:00 (EET)
  - Summer (DST): UTC+03:00 (EEST)
- Postal index: 38200—38281
- Area code: +380-5341
- Website: Official homepage

Semenivka Raion (Ukrainian: Семенівський район) was a raion (district) in Poltava Oblast of central Ukraine. The raion's administrative center was the urban-type settlement of Semenivka. The raion was abolished and its territory was merged into Kremenchuk Raion on 18 July 2020 as part of the administrative reform of Ukraine, which reduced the number of raions of Poltava Oblast to four. The last estimate of the raion population was 23,722 (2020 est.)
