= Karlivka Raion =

Former subdivision of Poltava Oblast, Ukraine

Karlivka Raion Карлівський район
- Raion
- Flag Coat of arms

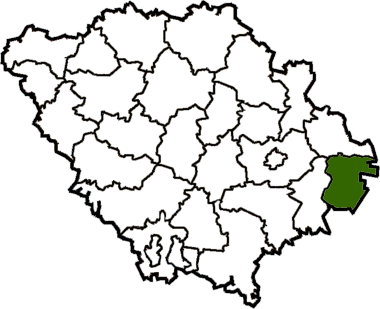
- Coordinates: 49°30′N 35°06′E
- Country: Ukraine
- Oblast: Poltava Oblast
- Established: 7 March 1923
- Disestablished: 18 July 2020
- Admin. center: Karlivka
- Subdivisions: List: — city councils; — settlement councils; — rural councils; Number of localities: — cities; — urban-type settlements; 25 — villages; — rural settlements

Government
  - Governor: Oleksiy Kobchenko

Area
  - Total: 854 km^{2} (330 sq mi)

Population (2020)
  - Total: 32,529
  - Density: 38.1/km^{2} (98.7/sq mi)
- Time zone: UTC+02:00 (EET)
  - Summer (DST): UTC+03:00 (EEST)
- Postal index: 39500—39543
- Area code: +380-5346
- Website: Official homepage

Karlivka Raion (Ukrainian: Карлівський район) was a raion (district) in Poltava Oblast in central Ukraine. The raion's administrative center was the city of Karlivka. The raion was abolished and its territory was merged into Poltava Raion on 18 July 2020 as part of the administrative reform of Ukraine, which reduced the number of raions of Poltava Oblast to four. The last estimate of the raion population was 32,539 (2020 est.)

At the time of disestablishment, the raion consisted of three hromadas:

- Karlivka urban hromada with the administration in Karlivka;
- Lanna rural hromada with the administration in the settlement of Lanna;
- Martynivka rural hromada with the administration in the settlement of Martynivka.
