= Dykanka =

Rural locality in Poltava Oblast, Ukraine

Dykanka Диканька
- Rural settlement
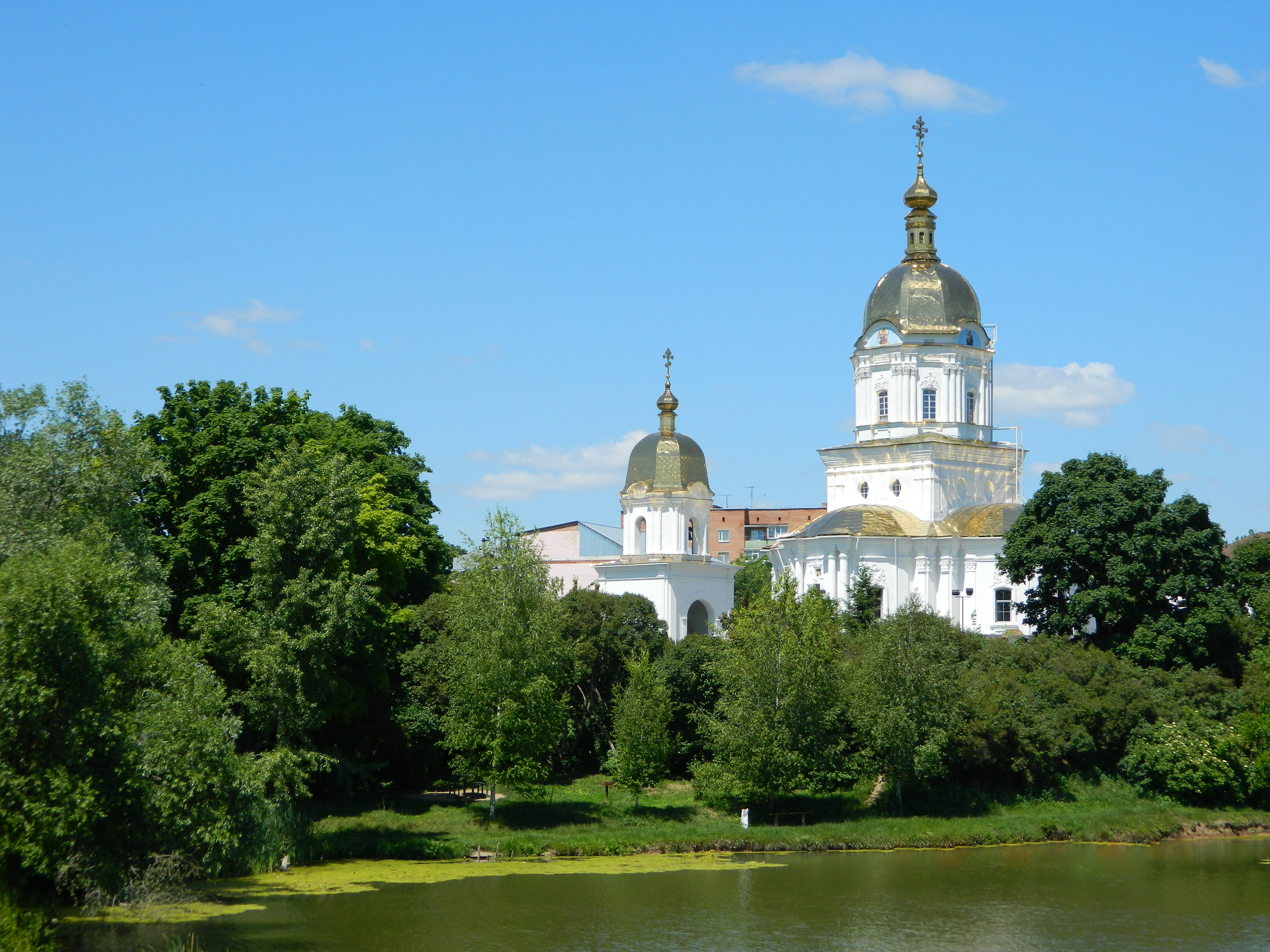
- Landscape with Holy Trinity Church

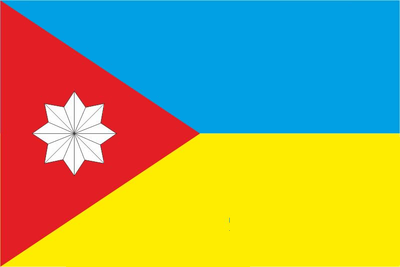
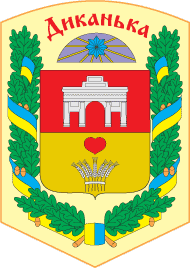
- Flag Coat of arms

- Location of Dykanka in Poltava Oblast Location of Dykanka in Ukraine
- Coordinates: 49°49′14″N 34°31′47″E
- Country: Ukraine
- Oblast: Poltava Oblast
- Raion: Poltava Raion
- Hromada: Dykanka settlement hromada
- Founded: 1658

Area
  - Total: 11.74 km^{2} (4.53 sq mi)
- Elevation: 72 m (236 ft)

Population (2022)
  - Total: 7,427
- Time zone: UTC+2 (EET)
  - Summer (DST): UTC+3 (EEST)
- Postal code: 38502
- Area code: 5351
- Licence plate: BI

Dykanka (Ukrainian: Диканька) is a rural settlement in Poltava Raion of Poltava Oblast in central Ukraine. It hosts the administration of Dykanka settlement hromada, one of the hromadas of Ukraine. Population: 7,427 (2022 estimate)

The settlement is located 26 km (16 mi) away from Poltava-Kyivska railway station.

== History ==
=== Ancient history ===
Dykanka was first mentioned in 1658 as a small village, though the area was populated for centuries before. Within the area of modern Dykanka, traces exist of Scythian settlement at various times. Also found were the remains of a settlement that had at one point been razed and the remains of two settlements from the 7th–6th centuries BC.

=== Medieval history ===
In 1430, the Dykanka area came under the ownership of Tatar Murza Leksada Mansurksanovych, the future Prince Alexander Glinski, and, according to Leo Padalka and other pre-revolutionary (before 1917) historians, Dykanka was among his ″settlements″.

=== Early modern era ===
In 1658 Dykanka was the site of a battle between the troops of hetman Ivan Vyhovsky and Zaporozhian Cossacks commanded by Yakiv Barabash. In 1689 the village became a property of the Kochubey family, remaining under their ownership into the 20th century.

=== Modern history ===
Dykanka has held the status of urban-type settlement since 1957.

Until 18 July 2020, Dykanka was the administrative center of Dykanka Raion. The raion was abolished in July 2020 as part of the administrative reform of Ukraine, which reduced the number of raions of Poltava Oblast to four. The area of Dykanka Raion was merged into Poltava Raion. On 26 January 2024, a new law entered into force which abolished the urban-type settlement status, and Dykanka became a rural settlement.

== Culture ==
Dykanka is a traditional centre of folk arts, known for the production of lizhnyks and carpets. An industrial cooperative specializing on embroidery was active in the village during Soviet times.

Dykanka is the location of the short story collection Evenings on a Farm Near Dikanka by Nikolai Gogol. The tale of St John's Eve, concerning the family of the Church Sexton, inspired Mussorgsky's tone poem Night on the Bare Mountain.

== Gallery ==
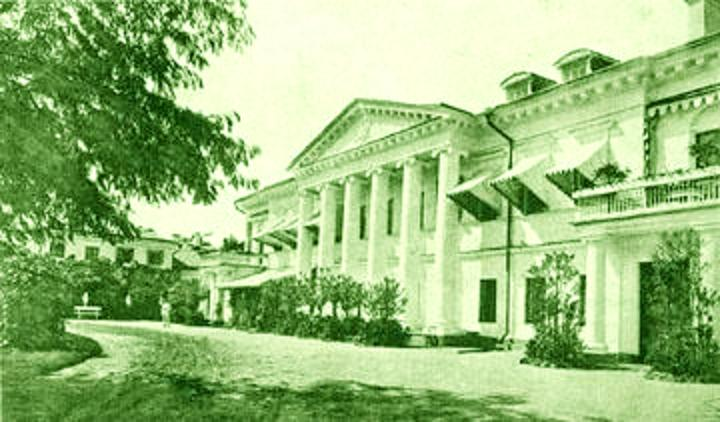
The facade of the palace of the estate Kochubeys. The architect Giacomo Quarenghi. Picture the end of 19th century

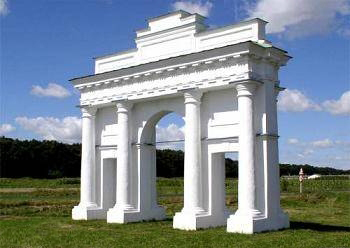
Triumphal Arch. The architect - the academician of architecture Luigi Rusca, 1820

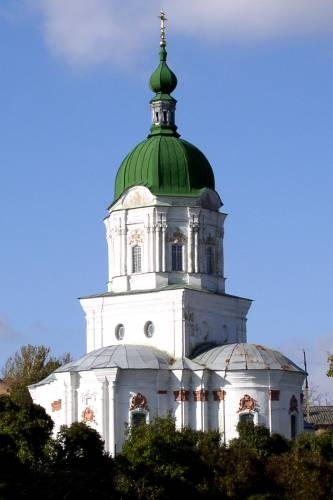
Church of the Holy Trinity, 1780, late Baroque

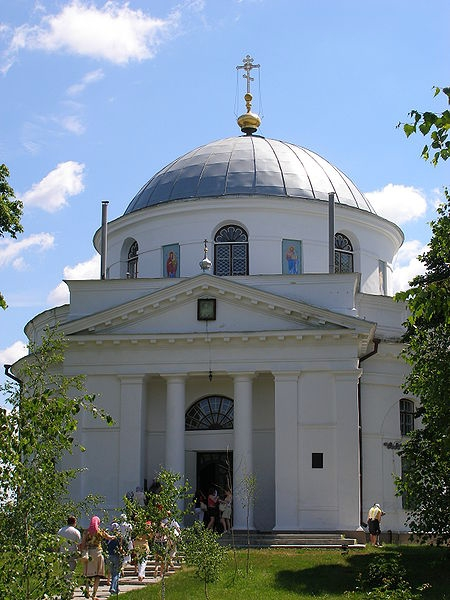
Church of St. Nicholas. Architect N. A. Lvov, 1797

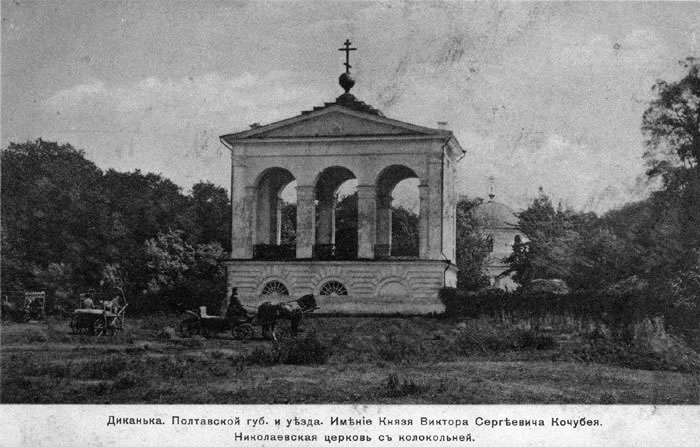
The bell tower of St. Nicholas Church. Architect Luigi Rusca, 1810–1827. Postcard late 19th century

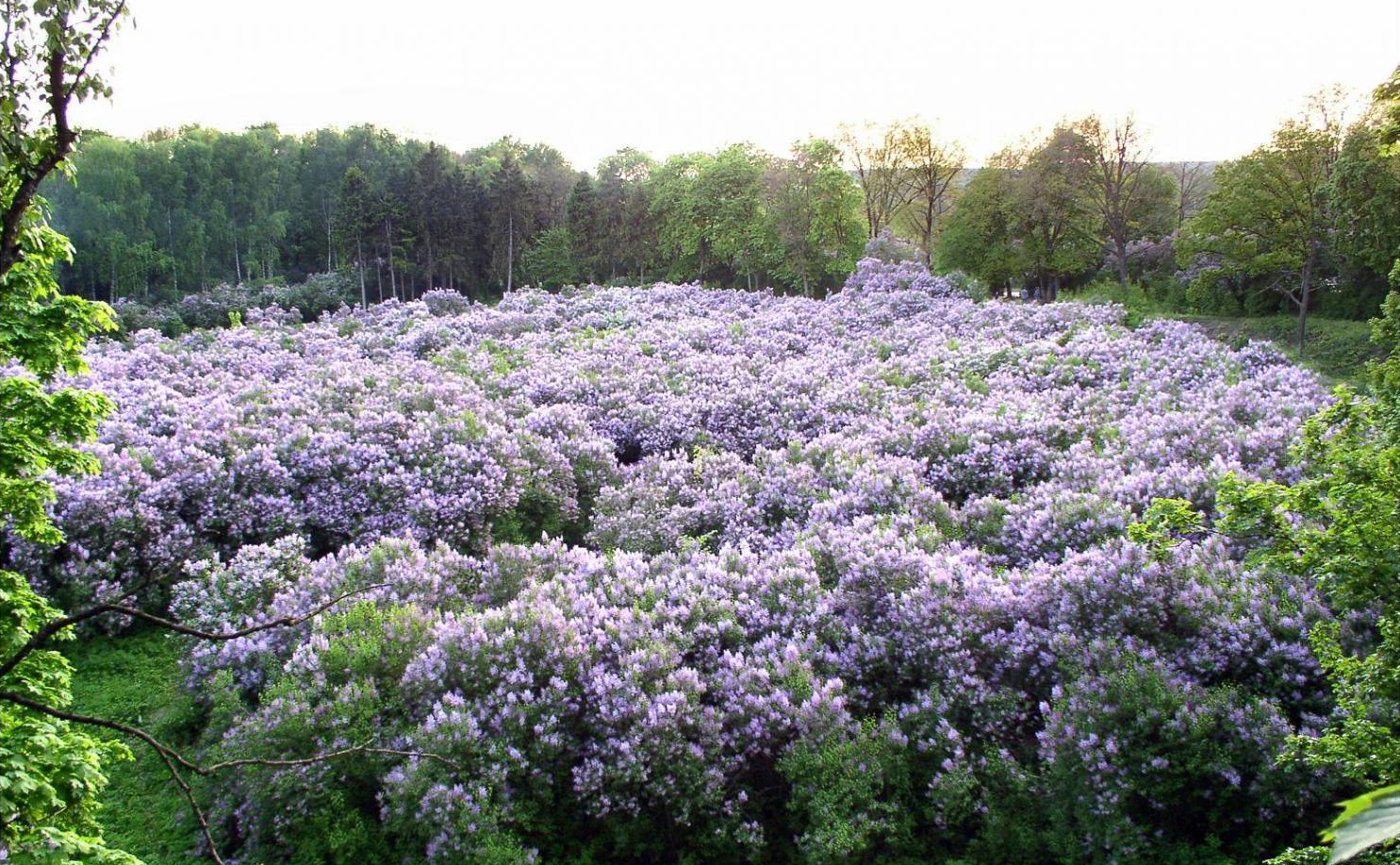
Lilac Grove. The former estate of Prince Kochubey. Laid down in the early 19th century

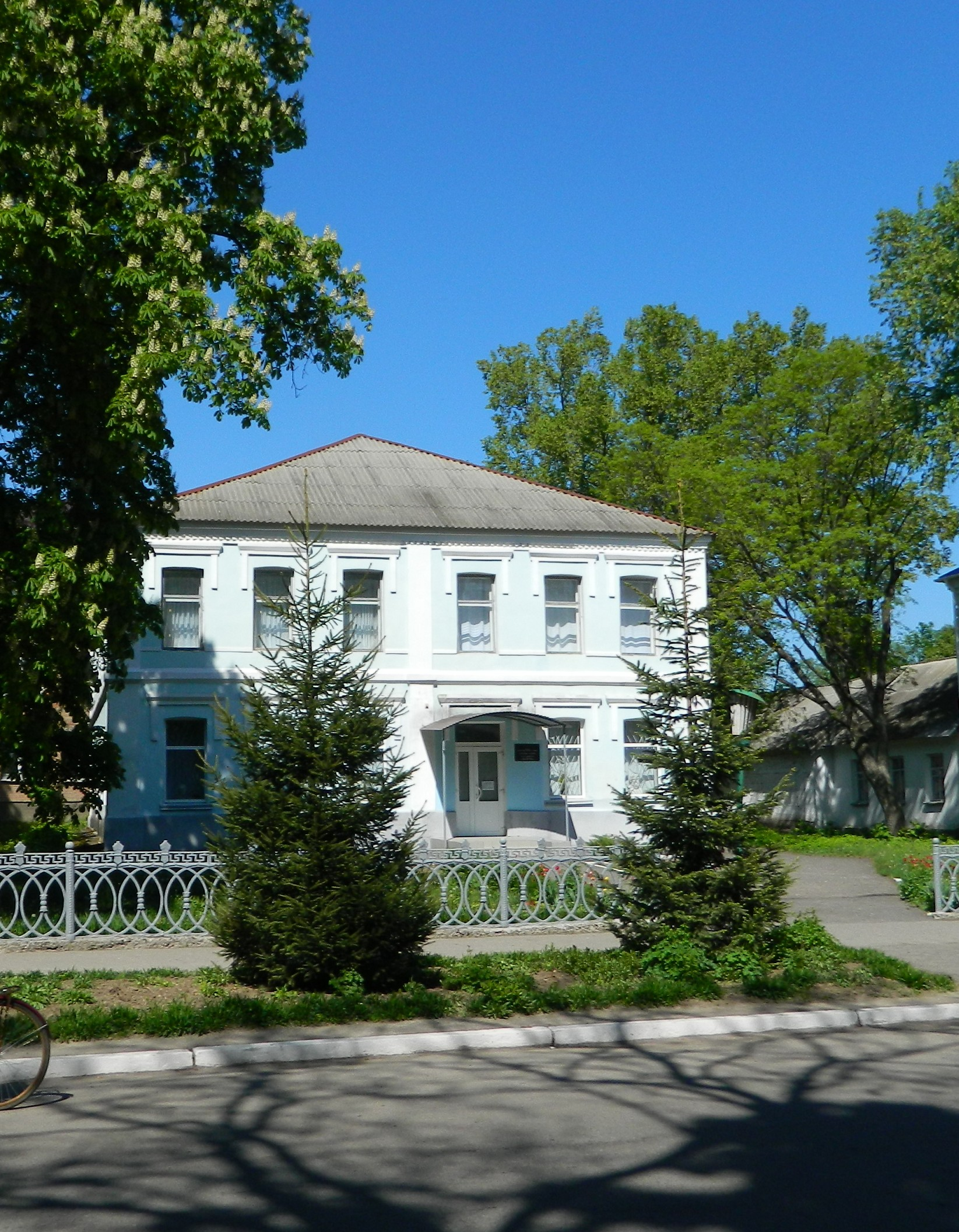
Picture gallery of Marie Bashkirtseff
