= List of villages in Poltava Oblast =

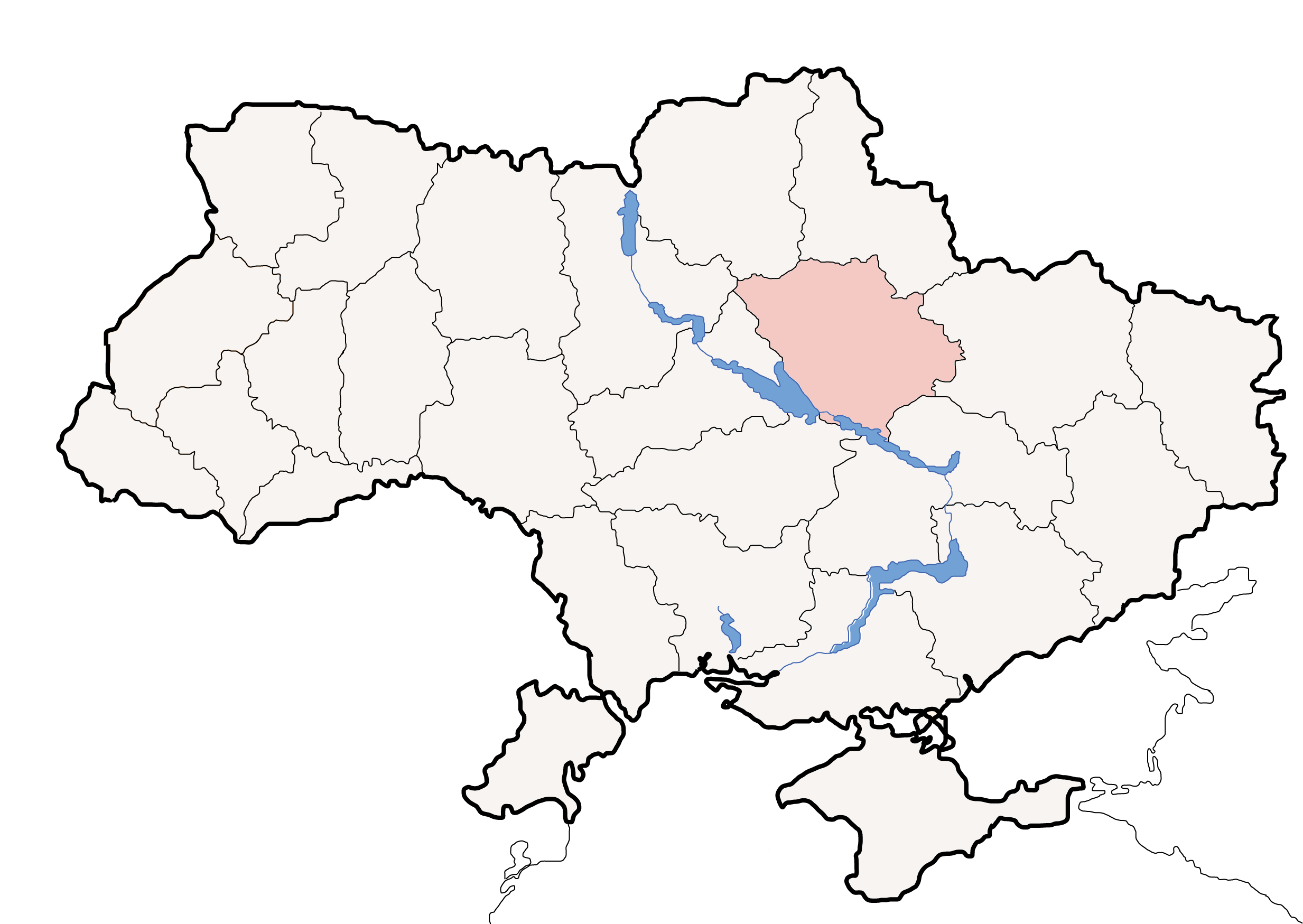
Map of the Poltava Oblast.

This is a list of villages of the Poltava Oblast (province) of central Ukraine.

== Kremenchuk Raion (Кременчуцький район) ==
- Biletskivka
- Bondari
- Burty
- Checheleve
- Chervona Znam"ianka
- Chykalivka
- Demydivka
- Dzerzhynske
- Fedorenky
- Horyslavtsi
- Hun'ky
- Kamiani Potoky
- Karpivka
- Keleberda
- Kindrivka
- Kobeliachok
- Korzhivka
- Kovali
- Kovalivka
- Kramarenky
- Kryvushi
- Lytvynenky
- Makhnivka
- Maksymivka
- Mala Kokhnivka
- Malamivka
- Malyky
- Mayborodivka
- Mykhaialenky
- Mylovydivka
- Myrne
- Naidenivka
- Nedoharky
- Novoselivka
- Ocheretuvate
- Olefirivka
- Omelnyk
- Onyschenky
- Ostaptsi
- Paschenivka
- Panivka
- Petrashivka
- Pidhirne
- Pischane
- Potoky
- Pryshyb
- Pykhal'schina
- Pysarschyna
- Pystovity
- P"iatykhatky
- Radochynu
- Revivka
- Robotivka
- Roiove
- Rokytne
- Rokytne-Donivka
- Romanky
- Sadky
- Salivka
- Samusiivka
- Sherbaky
- Sherbukhy
- Sosnivka
- Stara Biletskivka
- Stepivka
- Varakytu
- Vasylenky
- Vilna Tereshkivka
- Voskobiinyky
- Yalyntsi
- Yaremivka
- Yerystivka
- Zapsillia
- Zaruddia

== Lubny Raion (Лубенський район) ==
- Beresivka
- Bogodarivka
- Hryhorivka
- Korniyivka
- Korovayi
- Kulashyntsi
- Mayorstchyna
- Maryanivka
- Natalivka
- Ovsyuky
- Oleksandrivka
- Oleksiyivka
- Rudka
- Serbynivka
- Slobodo-Petrivka
- Sliporid-Ivanivka
- Stukalivka
- Tarasivka
- Ulyanovka

== Myrhorod Raion (Миргородський район) ==
- Bakumivka
- Baranivka
- Bilyky
- Velyki Obukhivka
- Velyki Bairak
- Velyki Sorochyntsi
- Verkhnya Budakivka
- Harkushyntsi
- Hasenky
- Dibrivka
- Yerky
- Zelenyi Kut
- Zubriv
- Zuivtsi
- Kybyntsi
- Klyushnykivka
- Komyshnya
- Maltsi
- Mali Sorochyntsi
- Ostapivka
- Panasivka
- Petrivtsi
- Polyvyane
- Popivka
- Romodan
- Savyntsi
- Slobidka
- Solontsi
- Khomutets
- Cherevky
- Cherkaschany
- Sharkivschyna
- Shakhvorostivka
- Shulhy
- Yarmaky
- Bezsaly
- Berbenytsi
- Bilohorilka
- Bodakva
- Vasylky
- Vyrishalne
- Hyryavi Iskivtsi
- Iskivtsi
- Korsunivka
- Khruli
- Lutsenky
- Luka
- Pisky
- Poharschtyna
- Ryhy
- Svyrydivka
- Sencha
- Tokari
- Kharkivtsi
- Yahnyky

== Poltava Raion (Полтавський район) ==
- Bayrak
- Berezova Luka
- Brodschyna
- Butenky
- Vasylivka
- Vilhuvatka
- Hryhoro-Bryhadyrivka
- Dashyvka
- Dryshyna Hreblya
- Zhuky
- Zolotarivka
- Ivanivka
- Kanavy
- Kirove
- Komendantivka
- Krasne
- Kunivka
- Luchky
- Markivka
- Ozera
- Orlyk
- Pidhora
- Radyanske
- Svitlohirske
- Suhynivka
- Chervoni Kvity
- Chorbivka
- Shenhury
