= Lutovynivka =

Village in Poltava Oblast, Ukraine

Lutovynivka Лутовинівка
- Village
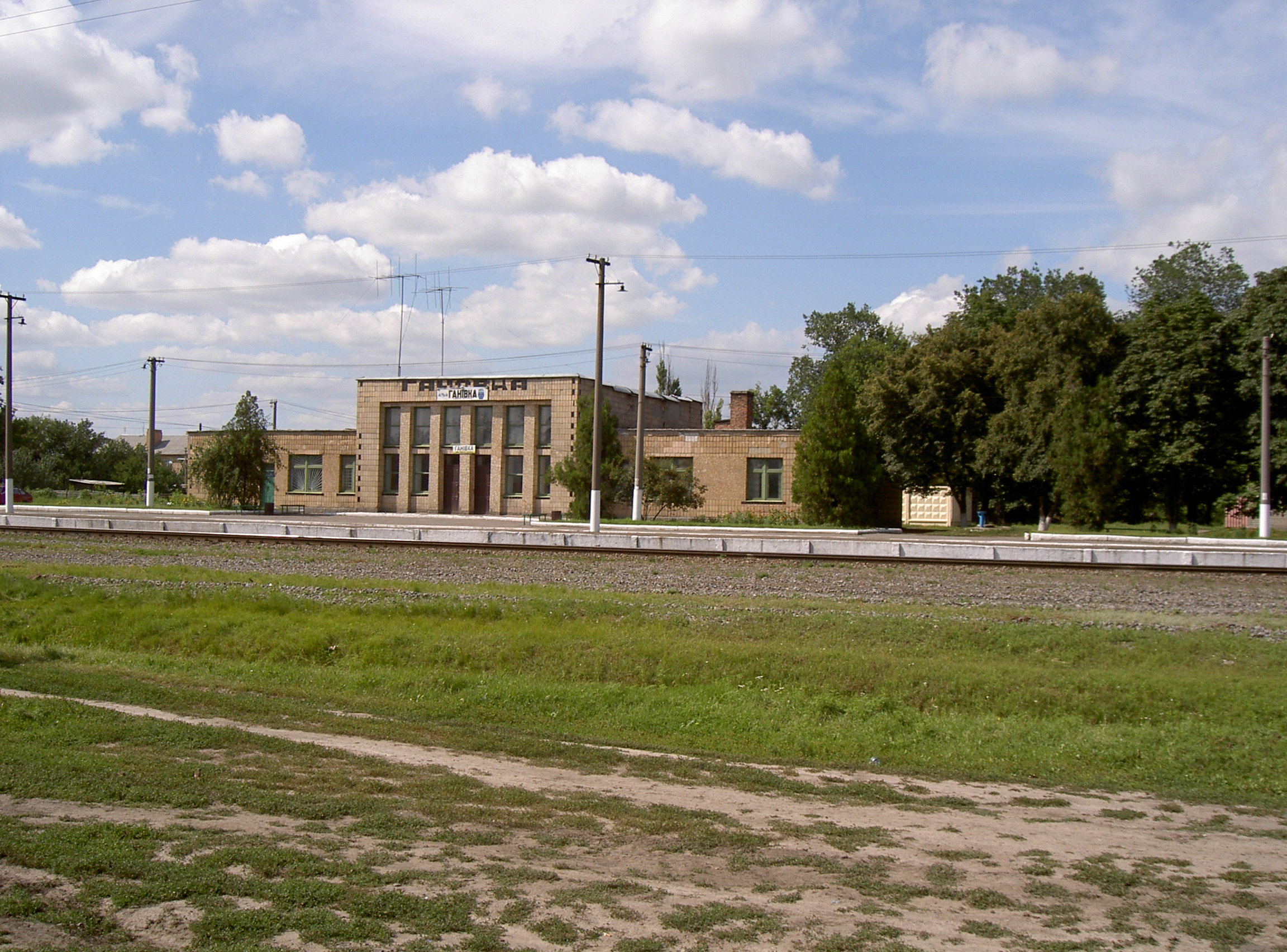
- Hannivka railway station in Lutovynivka

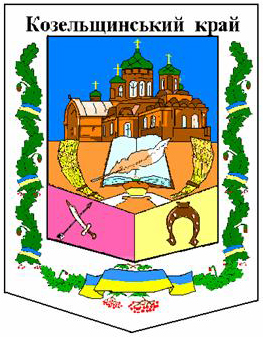
- Coat of arms

- Location of Lutovynivka
- Coordinates: 49°14′N 33°54′E
- Country: Ukraine
- Oblast: Poltava Oblast
- Raion: Kremenchuk Raion
- Hromada: Kozelshchyna settlement hromada
- Founded: 1923

Area
  - Total: 1 km^{2} (0.39 sq mi)
- Elevation: 158 m (518 ft)

Population
  - Total: 2,000
  - Density: 2,000/km^{2} (5,200/sq mi)
- Time zone: UTC+2 (EET)
  - Summer (DST): UTC+3 (EET)
- Postal code: 39100
- Area code: +380 5342

Lutovynivka (Ukrainian: Лутовинівка; Russian: Лутовиновка) is a small village, close to Kozelshchyna, in Kremenchuk Raion (district), Poltava Oblast (province) of central Ukraine, located 75 kilometres (47 mi) from Poltava. It belongs to Kozelshchyna settlement hromada, one of the hromadas of Ukraine. The current estimated population is around 500 (as of 2012). Lutovynivka is also a railway station, and located close to the highway M22-E584.

Until 18 July 2020, Lutovynivka belonged to Kozelshchyna Raion. The raion was abolished in July 2020 as part of the administrative reform of Ukraine, which reduced the number of raions of Poltava Oblast to four. The area of Kozelshchyna Raion was merged into Kremenchuk Raion.
