= Lutovinovka =

Lutovinovka (Russian: Лутовиновка) is the name of several rural localities in Russia and Ukraine:

- Lutovinovka, Bryansk Oblast, a village in Vladimirovsky Selsoviet of Rognedinsky District of Bryansk Oblast
- Lutovinovka, Lipetsk Oblast, a village in Vasilyevsky Selsoviet of Izmalkovsky District of Lipetsk Oblast
- Lutovinovka, Voronezh Oblast, a village in Timiryazevskoye Rural Settlement of Novousmansky District of Voronezh Oblast
- Lutovynivka, a village in Kremenchuk Raion (district), Poltava Oblast (province) of central Ukraine
