= Vesela Dolyna, Poltava Oblast =

Village in Poltava Oblast, Ukraine

Vesela Dolyna Весела Долина
- Location of Vesela Dolyna Vesela Dolyna (Ukraine)
- Coordinates: 49°24′18″N 33°28′34″E
- Country: Ukraine
- Oblast: Poltava Oblast
- Raion: Kremenchuk Raion
- Elevation: 112 m (367 ft)

Population (2001)
  - Total: 778
- Postal code: 39033
- Area code: +380 5365
- Climate: Cfa

Vesela Dolyna (Ukrainian: Весела Долина) is a village in Kremenchuk Raion, Poltava Oblast (province) of Ukraine. It belongs to Hlobyne urban hromada, one of the hromadas of Ukraine.

Until 18 July 2020, Vesela Dolyna was located in the Hlobyne Raion. The raion was abolished in July 2020 as part of the administrative reform of Ukraine, which reduced the number of raions of Poltava Oblast to four. The area of Hlobyne Raion was merged into Kremenchuk Raion.
