= Soloshyne =

Rural locality in Poltava Oblast, Ukraine

Soloshyne Солошине
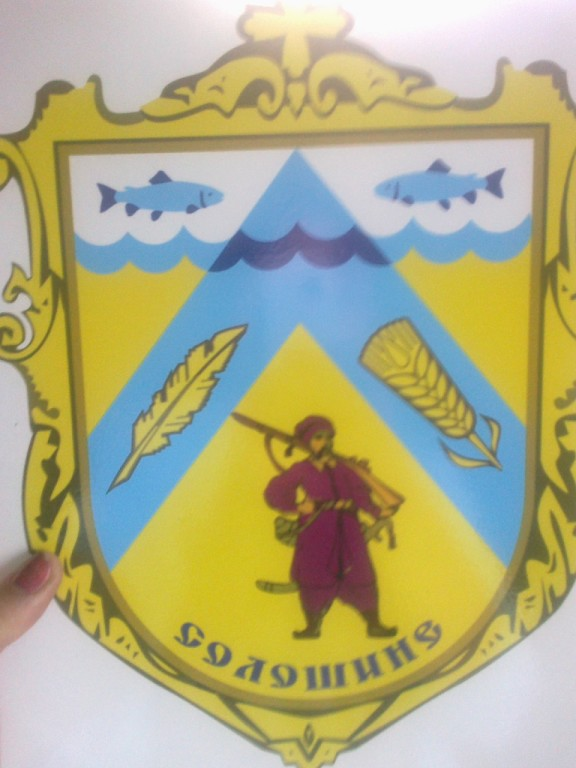
- Coat of arms

- Location in Poltava Oblast
- Coordinates: 48°57′12″N 33°56′44″E
- Country: Ukraine
- Oblast: Poltava Oblast
- Raion: Kremenchuk Raion
- Hromada: Horishni Plavni urban hromada
- Time zone: UTC+2 (EET)
  - Summer (DST): UTC+3 (EEST)
- Postal code: 39245

Soloshyne (Ukrainian: Солошине) is a village in the Horishni Plavni urban hromada of the Kremenchuk Raion of Poltava Oblast in Ukraine.

== History ==
On 19 July 2020, as a result of the administrative-territorial reform and liquidation of the Kobeliaky Raion, the village became part of the Kremenchuk Raion.

== Notable residents ==
- Pavlo Zahrebelnyi (1924–2009), Ukrainian novelist
