= Lower Sula National Nature Park =

National park in Ukraine

- Ukrainian: Нижньосульський національний природний парк
- IUCN category II (national park)
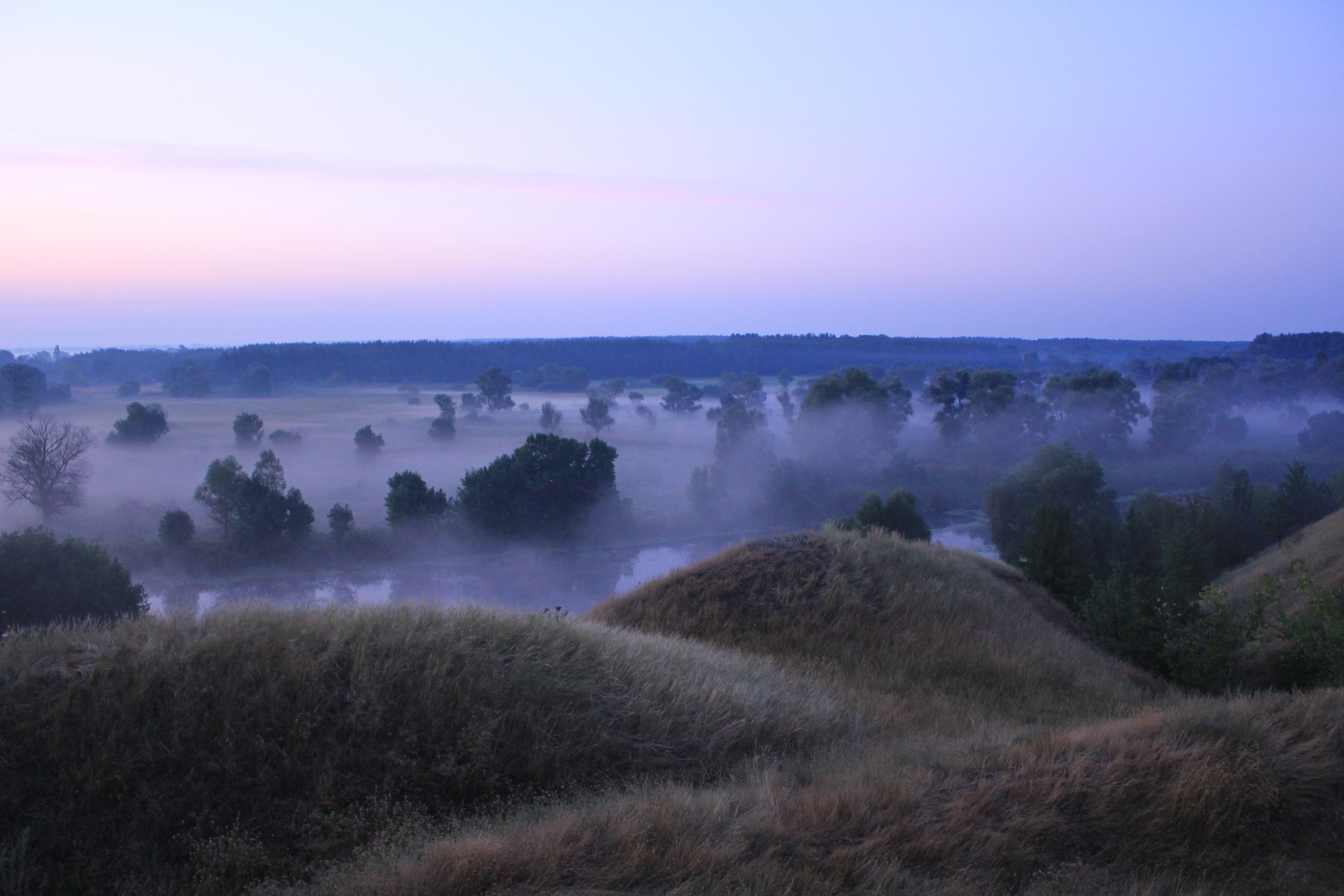
- Foggy Morning, Lower Sula National Nature Park

- Location within Ukraine
- Location: Poltava Oblast
- Nearest city: Lubny
- Coordinates: 49°36′28″N 33°11′37″E
- Area: 18,635 hectares (46,048 acres; 186 km^{2}; 72 sq mi)
- Established: 2010
- Governing body: Ministry of Ecology and Natural Resources (Ukraine)
- Website: https://nppns.at.ua/

The Lower Sula National Nature Park (Ukrainian: Нижньосульський національний природний парк) is a national park of Ukraine that covers the lower reaches of the Sula River as it enters the Kremenchuk Reservoir, 120 km southeast of Kyiv. The extensive marshes, swamps, and other wetlands of the area are important habitats for fish, waterfowl, and floodplain plants. The park is administratively in the Kremenchuk (until July 2020, Hlobyne), Orzhytsia, and Semenivka raions of Poltava Oblast, and Zolotonosha Raion (until July 2020, Chornobai Raion) of Cherkasy Oblast.

== Topography ==
The park was formed in 2010 by combining a series of protected areas, each of which retains its original form. These include:

- National landmark "Sulinsky", a spawning and wintering place for fish in the wetlands on the edge of the reservoir.
- Hydrological reserve "Velikoselytsky", a complex of shallow lakes, floodplain marshes, and swamps
- Hydrological reserve "Plekhovsky", a meadow and marsh area with wild elk, fox, Beech marten, and boar.
- Hydrological reserve "Salty", an area with saline soil and halophyte plants.
- Hydrological reserve "Rogozov's corner", an area of lakes, elevated bogs, and swamps.
- Reserve "Onyshkivsky", a landscape reserve.
- Heritage site "Tarasenkovsky", a cultural park and also an entomologia reserve.
- Hydrological reserve "Chutovsky", also a reserve of local cultural value.

These areas are spread along the Sula River, it lowers tributaries, and the approaches to the Kremenchuk Reservoir. Much of the terrain is flat, particularly around Sulsky Bay which opens into the reservoir; other areas of the right bank are hilly. In the bay, some islands reach 2–6 meters above water level.

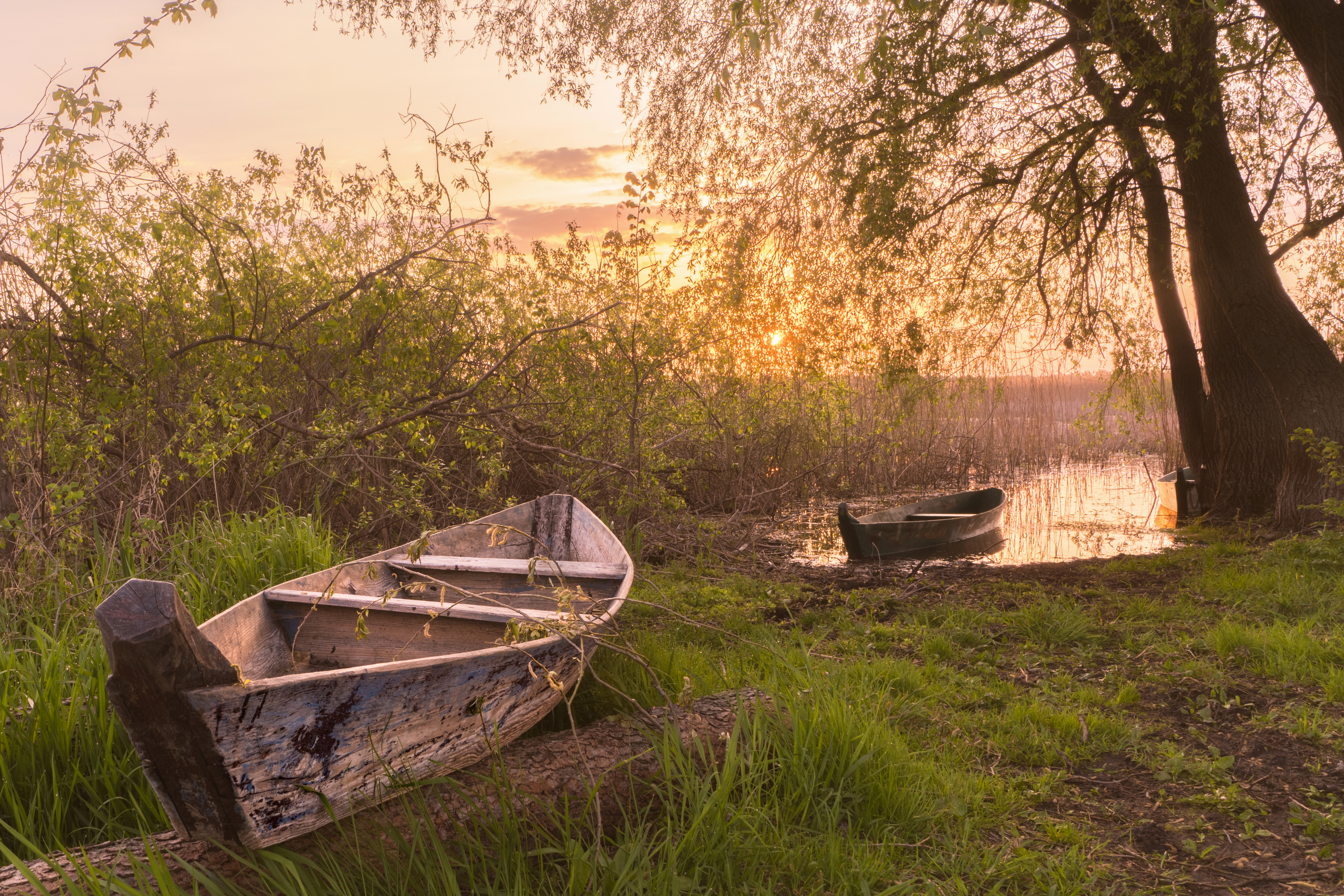
Boat landing on Sula River

== Climate and ecoregion ==
The climate of Lower Sula is Humid continental climate, warm summer (Köppen climate classification (Dfb). This climate is characterized by large seasonal temperature differentials and a warm summer (at least four months averaging over 10 °C (50 °F), but no month averaging over 22 °C (72 °F).

Lower Sula is located at the western edge of the East European forest steppe ecoregion, a transition zone between the broadleaf forests of the north and the grasslands to the south. This ecoregion is characterized by a mosaic of forests, steppe, and riverine wetlands.

== Flora and fauna ==
The park is in a botanical zone of terraced meadow steppes, terraced oak-pine forests, flood plains (of the Sula River and tributaries), eutrophic marshes and meadow-halophytic vegetation (heavily influenced by the creation of the reservoir in 1959). Large areas of the reservoir are shallow, and aquatic vegetation has become highly developed. Because the ecology of the area is relatively new, it has not yet been fully studied. It is believed that over 600 species of vascular plants are within the borders of the park.

== Public use ==
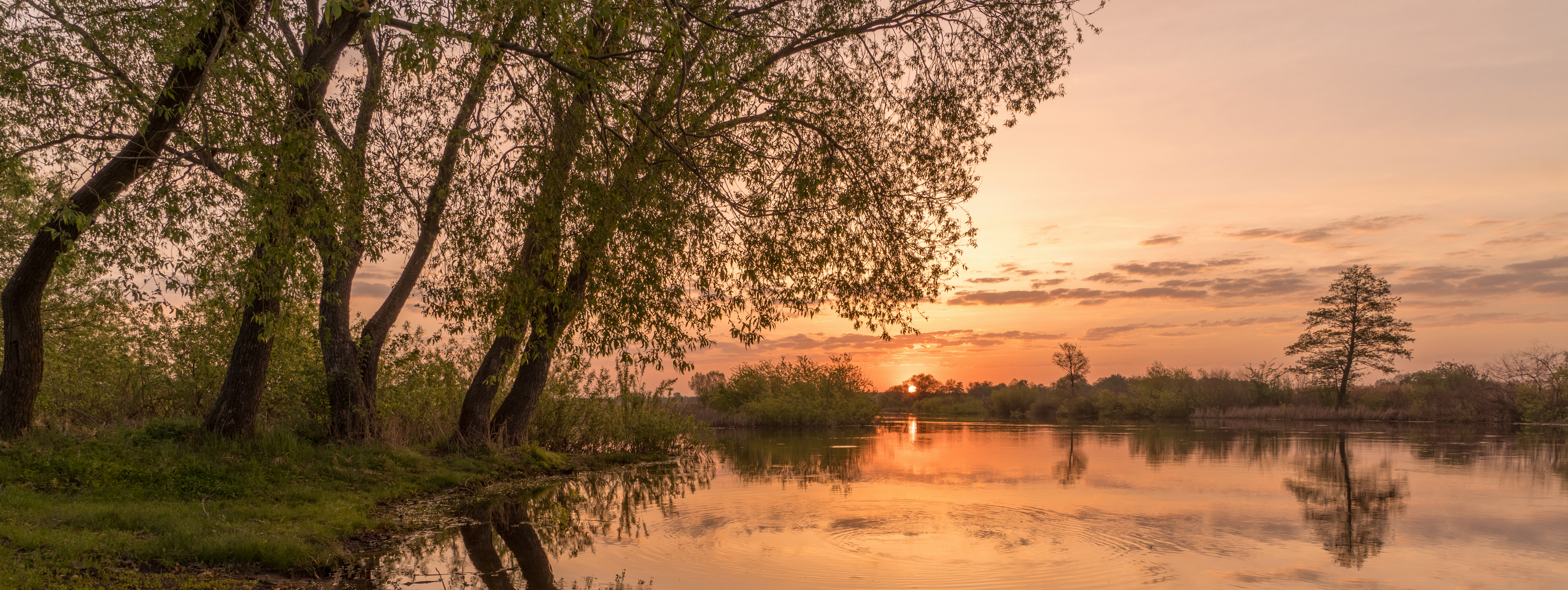
Dawn at the Sula River

A new ecological tour path was open in 2017, with visits to representative habitats of the park, and informational signs along the way. The park supports educational programs for local school children. Much of the park is set aside for nature protection, but recreational use is permitted in designated areas, and swimming, recreational fishing, and water tours are popular. There have been problems in the past with illegal fishing, poaching, and non-permitted private use. Security measures have increased in recent years; during a crackdown on illegal fishing in 2012, park officials removed 12.8 kilometers of prohibited nets from the park's waters.

== See also ==
- National Parks of Ukraine
