= Mykola Sushko =

Ukrainian entrepreneur and philanthropist

- Микола Сергійович Сушко
- Born: 1983 (age 42–43); Kozelshchyna, Poltava Oblast, Ukraine
- Occupations: Entrepreneur, investor
- Known for: Founder of the trading company Sfors; co-founder of the Mnozhyna Foundation
- Spouse: Anna Sushko

Mykola Serhiiovych Sushko (Ukrainian: Микола Сергійович Сушко; born 1983) is a Ukrainian entrepreneur and investor, founder of the trading company SFORS and the Smarter group of companies, which operate in proprietary trading, brokerage services and financial technology. He and his wife Anna Sushko are involved in charity work in Ukraine. In 2018 they founded the charitable organisation Sushko Philanthropy.

== Biography ==
Sushko is a native of the Kozelshchyna community in Poltava Oblast. In 2006 he graduated from Kyiv National University with a degree in economic cybernetics. He later studied at several business schools: for a year at a Ukrainian one, then in a modular programme at a Polish business school, and afterwards at the Kyiv-Mohyla Business School (KMBS).

== Business ==
Sushko began trading on financial markets in the early 2000s. He first worked on the Forex market and the Ukrainian stock market, and later concentrated on the US stock market and proprietary trading. Before the COVID-19 pandemic he was building business infrastructure outside Ukraine, in particular in Cyprus and Dubai. In 2020, rising volatility on global stock markets coincided with the expansion of his trading activity.

He founded a group of companies that includes the proprietary trading company Sfors, the broker-dealer Statok and the fintech company PineSoftware. He is also involved in real estate development through the company Founders Development. In 2024 the company and the architecture firm Oppenheim Architecture presented the Smartland residential complex in the Pyla community in Cyprus. The Cypriot interior minister Konstantinos Ioannou and the Ukrainian ambassador to Cyprus took part in the presentation.

== Philanthropy ==
Sushko has been involved in charity since 2018. In the same year he and his wife founded Sushko Philanthropy. The organisation's main areas of work are education, culture, medicine and local community development. In September 2020 the cultural and educational centre "Smart Prostir", funded by Sushko, opened in Kozelshchyna, Poltava Oblast, in the building of the former central district library.

Medical projects are supported through the Nadiyetvortsi foundation, established in 2020. In 2022 the foundation financed the renovation of the children's intensive care unit at the Lukyanova Institute of Pediatrics, Obstetrics and Gynecology in Kyiv. In November 2024 a renovated children's intensive care unit opened at the Amosov National Institute of Cardiovascular Surgery, with the assistance of Sushko Foundation. In September 2026 a comprehensive rehabilitation department opened in Kozelshchyna with the participation of Sushko Philanthropy and the Nadiyetvortsi foundation.

Sushko is a patron of the Georgiy Gongadze Prize, which was established in 2019 by Ukrainian PEN together with the journalist's family, the Kyiv-Mohyla Business School and Ukrainska Pravda.

After the start of the full-scale Russian invasion of Ukraine, the Ukrainian cultural and educational centre "Obiimy" was created in Cyprus on the initiative of Sushko's charitable foundation.

In November 2025 Mykola and Anna Sushko founded the charitable organisation "Mnozhyna Foundation". It was presented publicly on 15 April 2026 at the Mystetskyi Arsenal in Kyiv.

== Personal life ==
Sushko is married to Anna Sushko, with whom he carries out charitable projects and founded the charitable organisation Sushko Philanthropy.
