= Horishni Plavni urban hromada =

Horishni Plavni urban hromada Горішньоплавнівська міська громада
- Hromada
- Interactive map of Horishni Plavni urban hromada
- Country: Ukraine
- Oblast: Poltava Oblast
- Raion: Kremenchuk Raion
- Admin. center: Horishni Plavni

Area
  - Total: 365.6 km^{2} (141.2 sq mi)

Population (2026)
  - Total: 54,524
  - Density: 149.1/km^{2} (386.3/sq mi)
- CATOTTG code: UA53020030000081709
- Settlements: 15
- Cities: 1
- Villages: 14
- Website: https://hp-rada.gov.ua/

Horishni Plavni urban territorial hromada (Ukrainian: Горішньоплавнівська міська територіальна громада, romanized: Horishnioplavnivska miska terytorialna hromada) is one of the hromadas of Ukraine, located in Kremenchuk Raion, Poltava Oblast. Its administrative centre is the city of Horishni Plavni.

== History ==
Established on April 16, 2019, through the merger of the Keleberda and Salivka village councils of Kremenchuk Raion with the Horishni Plavni City Council of regional significance.

In accordance with the Law of Ukraine "On Amendments to the Law of Ukraine 'On Voluntary Amalgamation of Territorial Communities' regarding the voluntary accession of village and settlement territorial hromadas to territorial hromadas of cities of republican significance (Autonomous Republic of Crimea) or cities of regional significance," communities formed through the accession of adjacent communities to cities of regional significance are recognized as capable and do not require the holding of elections.

In April 2019, the villages of Keleberda, Salivka, Karpivka, and Makhnivka were incorporated.

On July 7, 2020, the Hryhoro-Bryhadyrivka Village Council of Kobeliaky Raion and the Dmytrivka Village Council of Horishni Plavni City Council voluntarily joined the hromada.

== Composition ==
In addition to one city (Hlobyne), there are 14 villages within the hromada:

- Bazaluky
- Dmytrivka
- Hora
- Hryhoro-Bryhadyrivka
- Karpivka
- Keleberda
- Kuzmenky
- Kyiashky
- Makhnivka
- Motryne
- Petrashivka
- Salivka
- Solontsi
- Soloshyne
