= Kremenchuk urban hromada =

Urban hromada of Poltava Oblast, Ukraine

Kremenchuk urban hromada Кременчуцька міська громада
- Hromada
- Interactive map of Kremenchuk urban hromada
- Country: Ukraine
- Oblast: Poltava Oblast
- Raion: Kremenchuk Raion
- Admin. center: Kremenchuk

Area
  - Total: 165.1 km^{2} (63.7 sq mi)

Population (2023)
  - Total: 229,697
  - Density: 1,391/km^{2} (3,603/sq mi)
- CATOTTG code: UA53020110000092487
- Settlements: 5
- Cities: 1
- Villages: 4
- Website: kremen.gov.ua

Kremenchuk urban territorial hromada (Ukrainian: Кременчуцька міська територіальна громада, romanized: Kremenchutska miska terytorialna hromada) is one of Ukraine's hromadas, located in Kremenchuk Raion within Poltava Oblast. Its capital is the city of Kremenchuk.

The hromada has an area of 165.1 km^{2} (63.7 mi^{2}), as well as a total population of 229,697 (as of 2023).

== Composition ==
In addition to one city (Kremenchuk), the hromada includes four villages:

- Mala Kokhnivka
- Potoky
- Prydniprianske
- Sosnivka
