= Pavlo Zahrebelnyi =

Ukrainian writer

Hero of Ukraine Pavlo Zahrebelnyi
- Павло Загребельний
- Born: 25 August 1924; Soloshyne, Poltava Governorate, Soviet Union
- Died: 3 February 2009 (aged 84); Kyiv, Ukraine
- Occupation: Writer
- Awards: Hero of Ukraine; Shevchenko National Prize

Signature
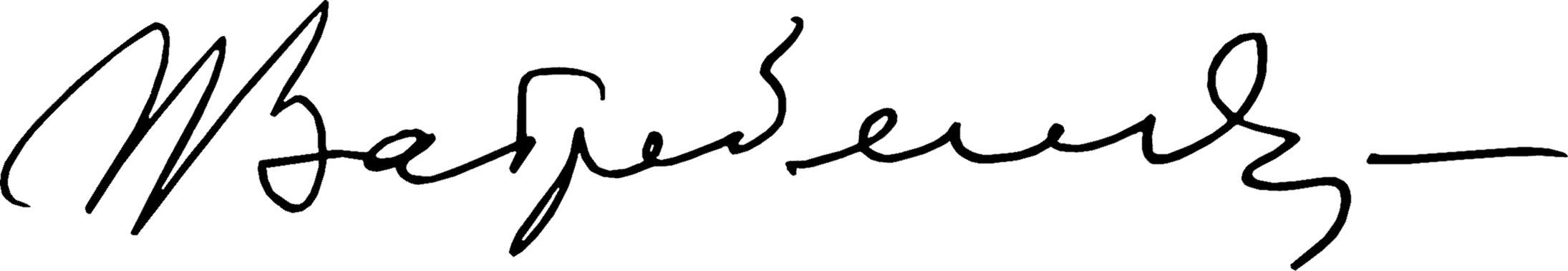

Pavlo Arkhypovych Zahrebelnyi (Ukrainian: Павло Архипович Загребельний) or Pavel Arkhipovich Zagrebelnyi (Russian: Павел Архипович Загребельный, romanized: Pavel Arkhipovich Zagrebelny; 25 August 1924 – 3 February 2009) was a Soviet and Ukrainian novelist.

== Biography ==
He graduated from secondary school in 1941. That same year, when Germany invaded the Soviet Union, he enlisted the Red Army, participated in the Battle of Kiev, and was severely wounded. After recovering, he was returned to service again and received another serious wound in August 1942. On that occasion, he was captured and was in a Nazi prisoner-of-war camp until February 1945.

Upon his release, he worked for the Soviet military mission in West Germany, then served as a journalist at a collective farm. In 1951, he began studying philology at Dnepropetrovsk State University. This was followed by several editorial positions; notably as deputy editor-in-chief for the journal Vitchyzna. He was the editor-in-chief of Literaturna Ukrayina from 1961 to 1963. It was during this time that he started writing novels.

From 1973 to 1986, he held several positions at the National Writers' Union of Ukraine, eventually becoming First Secretary, despite efforts by the poet Borys Oliynyk to deny him that position. He was awarded the Shevchenko National Prize in 1974 and the USSR State Prize in 1980. He also received the Hero of Ukraine award for his works on 25 August 2004.

One of his best known novels is Roksolana (1980), about the life of Anastasia Lisovska, a Ruthenian girl from Galicia who became a wife of Sultan Suleiman the Magnificent and played a prominent role in the sixteenth century Ottoman Empire.

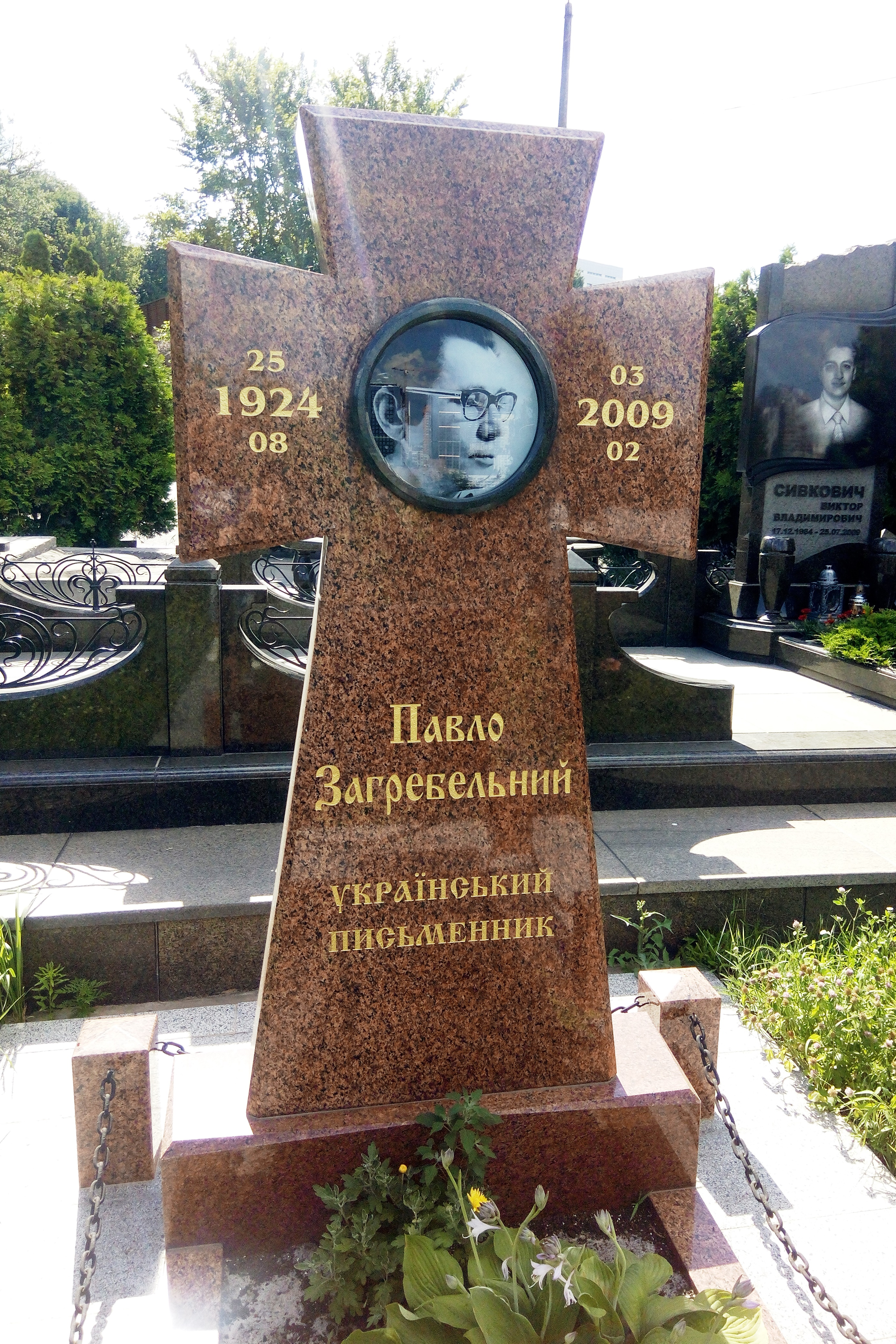
The tombstone of Pavlo Zahrebelnyi at the Baykove cemetery

On 5 February 2009, President Viktor Yushchenko paid his last respects to Zahrebelnyi.

In December 2022 the Nikolay Raevsky street in Kyiv was renamed to Pavlo Zahrebelnyi street.

Zahrebelny's books have been translated into 23 languages.

== Bibliography ==
Zahrebelny's works include novels and stories like:

- "Thinking About Eternity" (1957)
- "Europe-45" (1958)
- "Heat" (1960)
- "Europe West" (1961)
- "A Day For a Future" (1964)
- "Whisper" (1966)
- "Kind Devil" (1967)
- "Wonder" (1968)
- "From the Point of Eternity" (1970)
- "Let's Come to Love" (1971)
- "First Bridge" (1972)
- "Death in Kyiv" (1973)
- "Lathered Grass" (1974)
- "Eupraksia" (1975)
- "Lion's Heart" (1978)
- "Acceleration" (1978)
- "Clarinets of Tenderness" (1978)
- "Roksolana" (1980)
- "I am Bohdan" (1983)
- "Southern Comfort" (1984)
- "Expulsion from Eden" (1985)
- "The Sixth Day" (1985)
- "Traceless Lucas" (1989)
- "Naked Soul" (1992)
- "Angel Flesh" (1993)
- "Thousand-Year-Old Nikolai" (1994)
- "Ashes of Dreams" (1995)
- "The Long Dreams Valley" (1995)
- "Heat Haze" (1995)
- "Special Security Zone" (1999)
- "Julia" (2000)

Cultural offices
Preceded by Mykola Shamota	Shevchenko National Prize Committee Chair; 1980 – 1987	Succeeded by Maksym Orlyk
