= Hradyzk =

Rural locality in Poltava Oblast, Ukraine

Hradyzk Градизьк
- Rural settlement
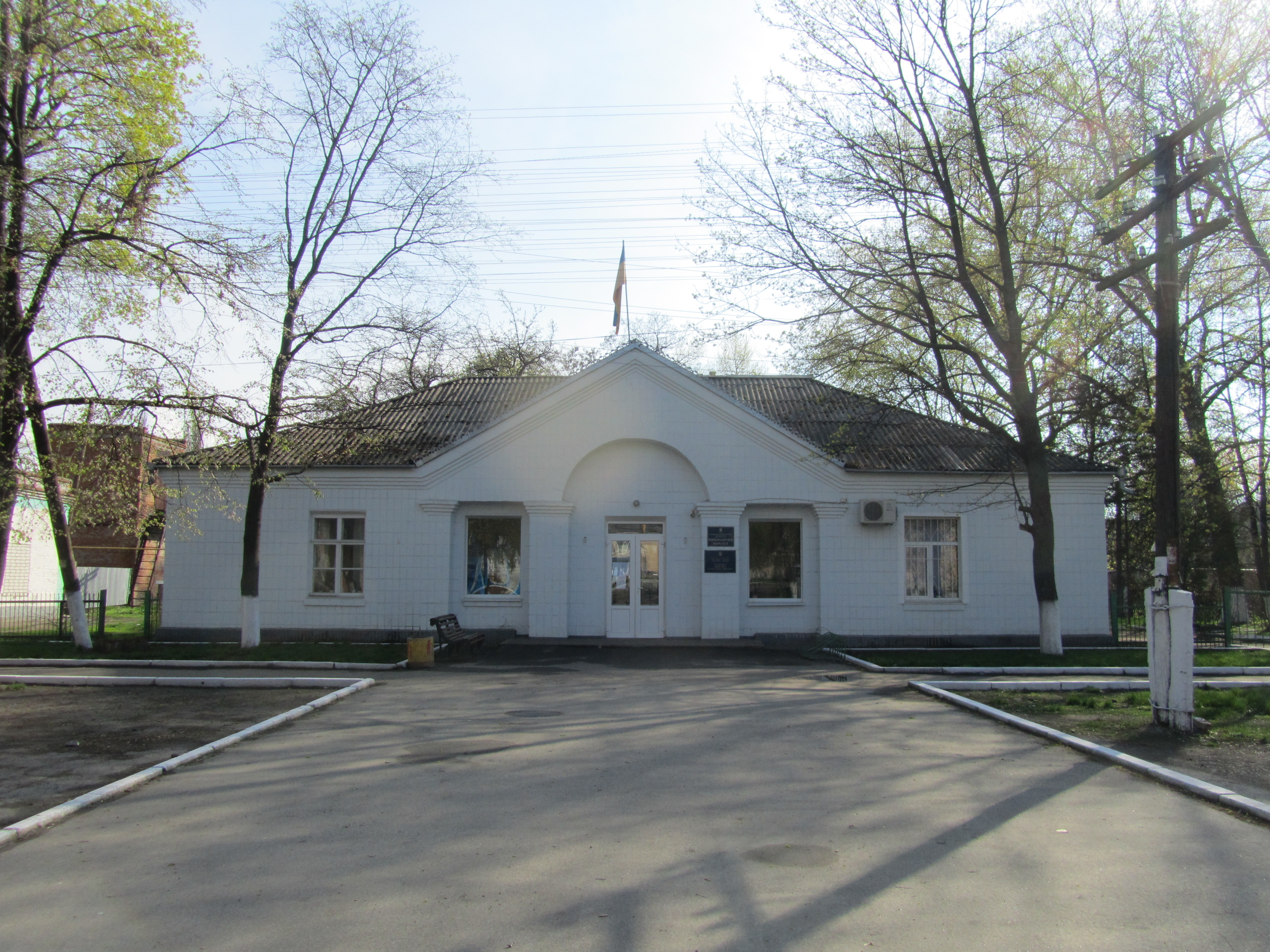
- Hradyzk Village Council

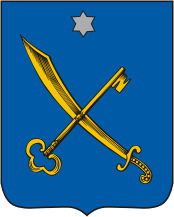
- Coat of arms

- Location within Poltava Oblast Location within Ukraine
- Coordinates: 49°13′47″N 33°07′53″E
- Country: Ukraine
- Oblast: Poltava Oblast
- Raion: Kremenchuk Raion
- Founded: 865

Population (2022)
  - Total: 5,962
- Postal code: 39072
- Area code: +380 5365

Hradyzk (Ukrainian: Градизьк) is a rural settlement in Kremenchuk Raion of Poltava Oblast, in central Ukraine. It hosts the administration of Hradyzk settlement hromada, one of the hromadas of Ukraine. Population: 6,962 (2022 estimate).

Hradyzk is also known as Horodyshche.

== History ==
During the Ukrainian War of Independence, from 1917 to 1920, it passed between various factions. Afterwards it was administratively part of the Kremenchuk Governorate of Ukraine, and after its dissolution of the Poltava Governorate of Ukraine.

Until 18 July 2020, Hradyzk belonged to Hlobyne Raion. The raion was abolished in July 2020 as part of the administrative reform of Ukraine, which reduced the number of raions of Poltava Oblast to four. The area of Hlobyne Raion was merged into Kremenchuk Raion.

Until 26 January 2024, Hradyzk was designated urban-type settlement. On this day, a new law entered into force which abolished this status, and Hradyzk became a rural settlement.

== Sights ==
- Pyvykha
