= Hlobyne =

City in Poltava Oblast, Ukraine

Hlobyne Глобине
- City
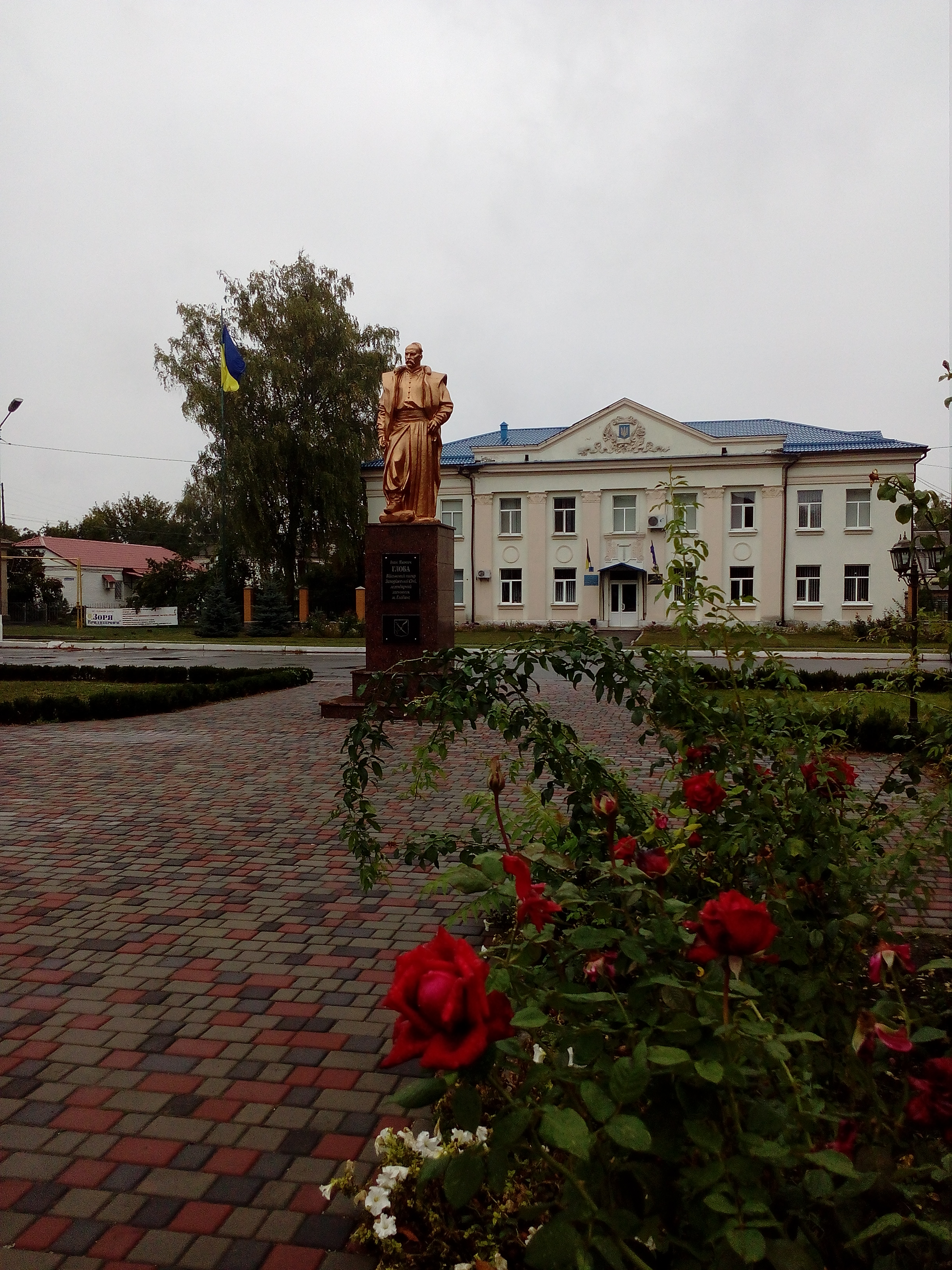
- Monument to the city's founder, Cossack Ivan Hloba

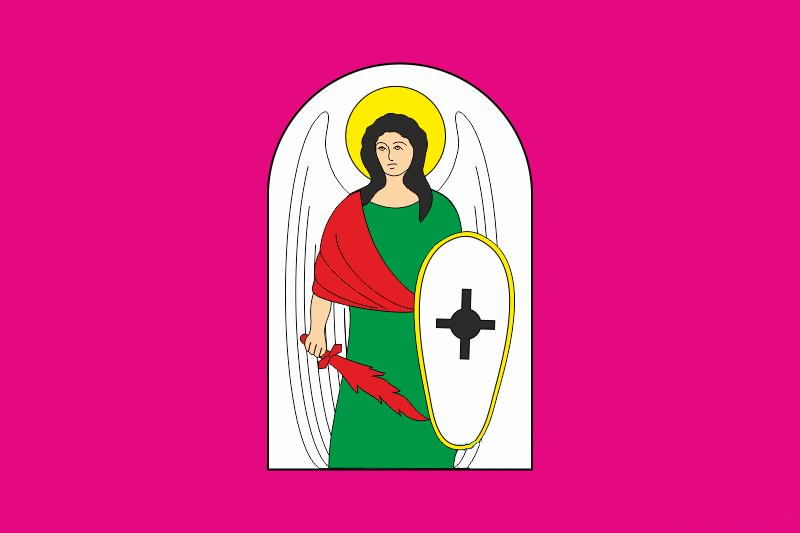
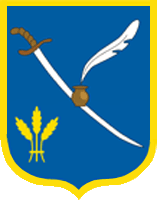
- Flag Coat of arms
- Interactive map of Hlobyne
- Location within Poltava Oblast Location within Ukraine
- Coordinates: 49°23′25″N 33°15′01″E
- Country: Ukraine
- Oblast: Poltava Oblast
- Raion: Kremenchuk Raion
- Hromada: Hlobyne urban hromada
- First mentioned: 1725

Population (2022)
  - Total: 8,955
- Postal code: 39000
- Area code: +380 5365
- Website: https://globynska-gromada.gov.ua/

Hlobyne (Ukrainian: Глобине, pronounced [ˈɦlɔbɪne]; Russian: Глобино) is a city in Kremenchuk Raion, Poltava Oblast, Ukraine. It hosts the administration of Hlobyne urban hromada, one of the hromadas of Ukraine. Population: 8,955 (2022 estimate).

== Geography ==
Hlobyne is located in the central part of Kremenchuk Raion, 37 km from the district center (Kremenchuk), 96 km from the regional center (Poltava). The city is located on the Dnieper lowland, in the forest steppe natural zone, on the left bank of the Dnieper valley. The city is fed by a tributary of the Psel River. Chernozems dominate the territory of the Hlobyne.

The climate of the Hlobyne is temperate continental. The average temperature in January is −3.7 °C, in July it is +21.4 °C, the amount of precipitation is 480–580 mm/year, which falls mainly in the summer as rain.

== History ==
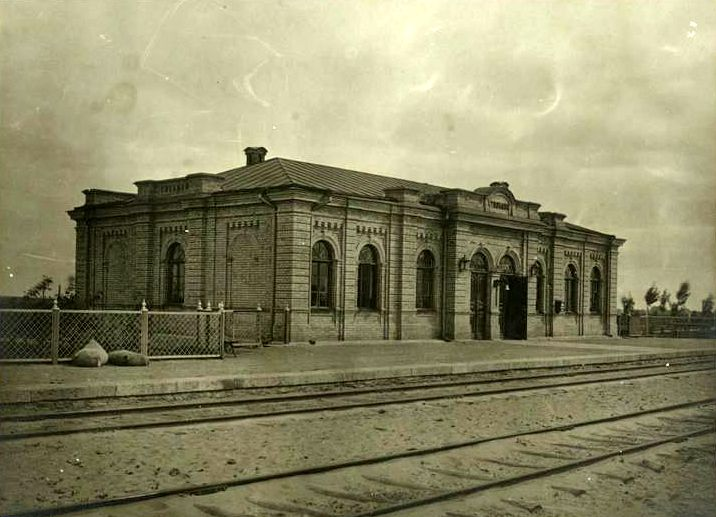
Railway station in the early 20th century

Hlobyne originally had the status of a town.

It was a village in Poltava Governorate of the Russian Empire.

During the Ukrainian War of Independence, from 1917 to 1920, it passed between various factions. Afterwards, it was administratively part of the Kremenchuk Governorate of Ukraine, and after its dissolution of the Poltava Governorate of Ukraine.

During World War II it was occupied by German troops since September 1941 until September 1943. A Nazi concentration camp was established in the buildings of the local sugar factory.

In 1976, the urban-type settlement of Hlobyne received the status of a city.

In January 1989 the population was 13 717 people.

In January 2013 the population was 10 043 people.

Until 18 July 2020, Hlobyne was the administrative center of Hlobyne Raion. The raion was abolished in July 2020 as part of the administrative reform of Ukraine, which reduced the number of raions of Poltava Oblast to four. The area of Hlobyne Raion was merged into Kremenchuk Raion.

== Demographics ==
As of the 2001 Ukrainian census, Hlobyne had a population of 12,801 inhabitants. The distribution of the population by ethnicity and native language according to the census data was as follows:

Ethnic groups in Hlobyne
	percent
Ukrainians	94.54%
Russians	4.43%
Belarusians	0.40%
Armenians	0.20%
Moldovans	0.15%
others	0.28%

Native languages in Hlobyne
	percent
Ukrainian	95.4%
Russian	4.1%
Belarusian	0.2%
Armenian	0.2%
Romanian	0.1%
others	0.0%

== Transport ==
Regional highways and a railway (Poltava-Oleksandriia) run through the city.

== Gallery ==
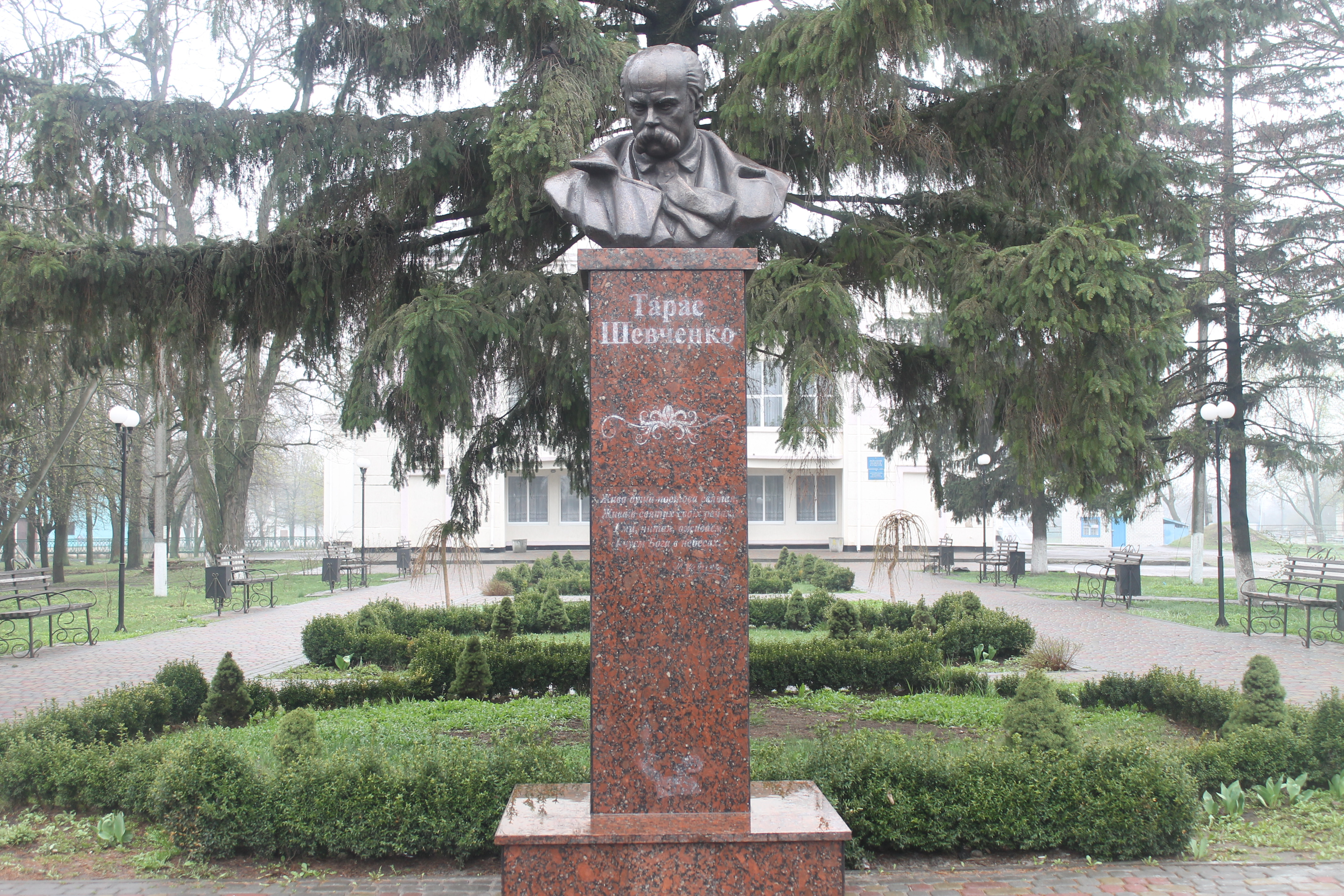
Taras Shevchenko monument

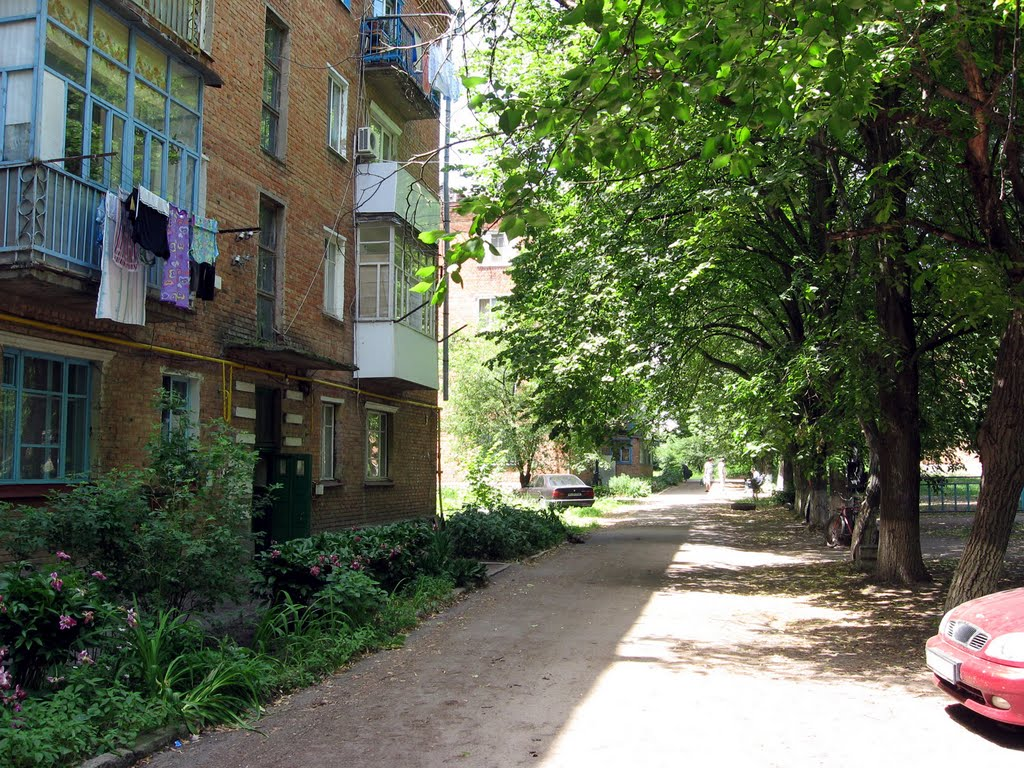
Cosmonauts Street in Hlobyne

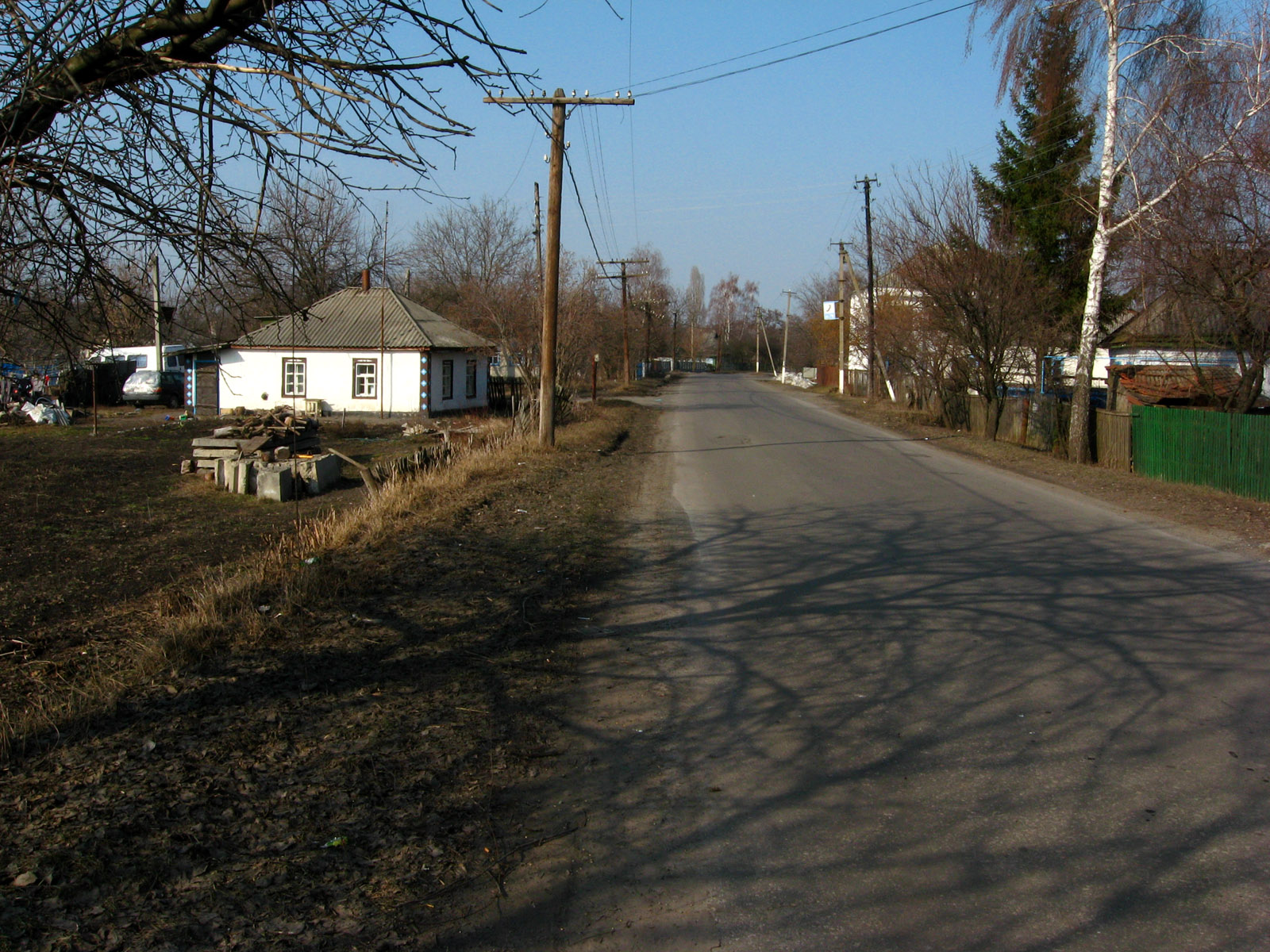
A street with private houses in Hlobyne
