= Nova Haleshchyna =

Rural locality in Poltava Oblast, Ukraine

Nova Haleshchyna Нова Галещина
- Rural settlement
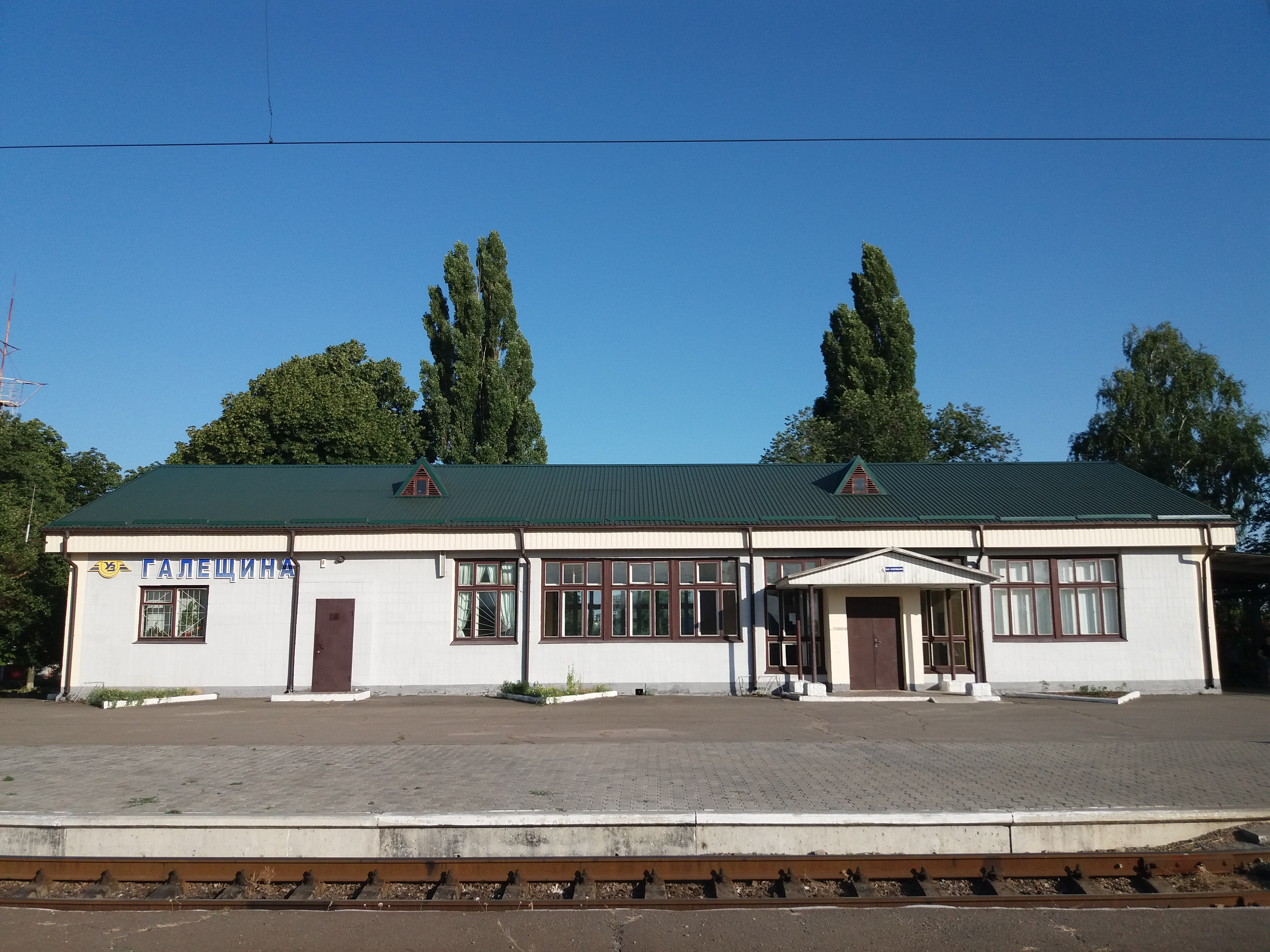

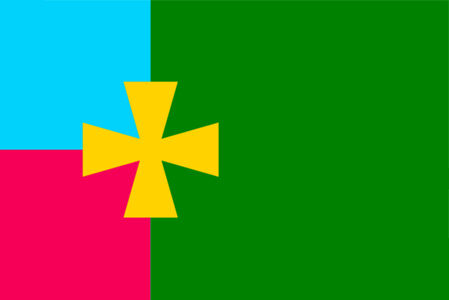
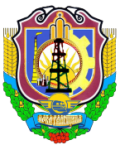
- Flag Seal

- Location in Poltava Oblast Location in Ukraine
- Country: Ukraine
- Oblast: Poltava Oblast
- Raion: Kremenchuk Raion

Population (2022)
  - Total: 2,124
- Time zone: UTC+2 (EET)
  - Summer (DST): UTC+3 (EEST)

Nova Haleshchyna (Ukrainian: Нова Галещина' Russian: Новая Галещина) is a rural settlement in Kremenchuk Raion, Poltava Oblast, Ukraine. It is located on the left bank of the Rydka, a left tributary of the Psel in the drainage basin of the Dnieper. Nova Haleshchyna hosts the administration of Nova Haleshchyna settlement hromada, one of the hromadas of Ukraine. Population: 2,124 (2022 estimate).

== History ==
Until 18 July 2020, Nova Haleshchyna belonged to Kozelshchyna Raion. The raion was abolished in July 2020 as part of the administrative reform of Ukraine, which reduced the number of raions of Poltava Oblast to four. The area of Kozelshchyna Raion was merged into Kremenchuk Raion.

Until 26 January 2024, Nova Haleshchyna was designated urban-type settlement. On this day, a new law entered into force which abolished this status, and Nova Haleshchyna became a rural settlement.

== Economy ==
=== Transportation ===
Haleshchyna railway station is located in Nova Haleshchyna. It is on the railway connecting Poltava and Kremenchuk. there is infrequent passenger traffic.

The settlement has access to the Highway M22 connecting Poltava with Oleksandriia via Kremenchuk.
