= Horishni Plavni =

City in Poltava Oblast, Ukraine

Horishni Plavni Горішні Плавні
- City
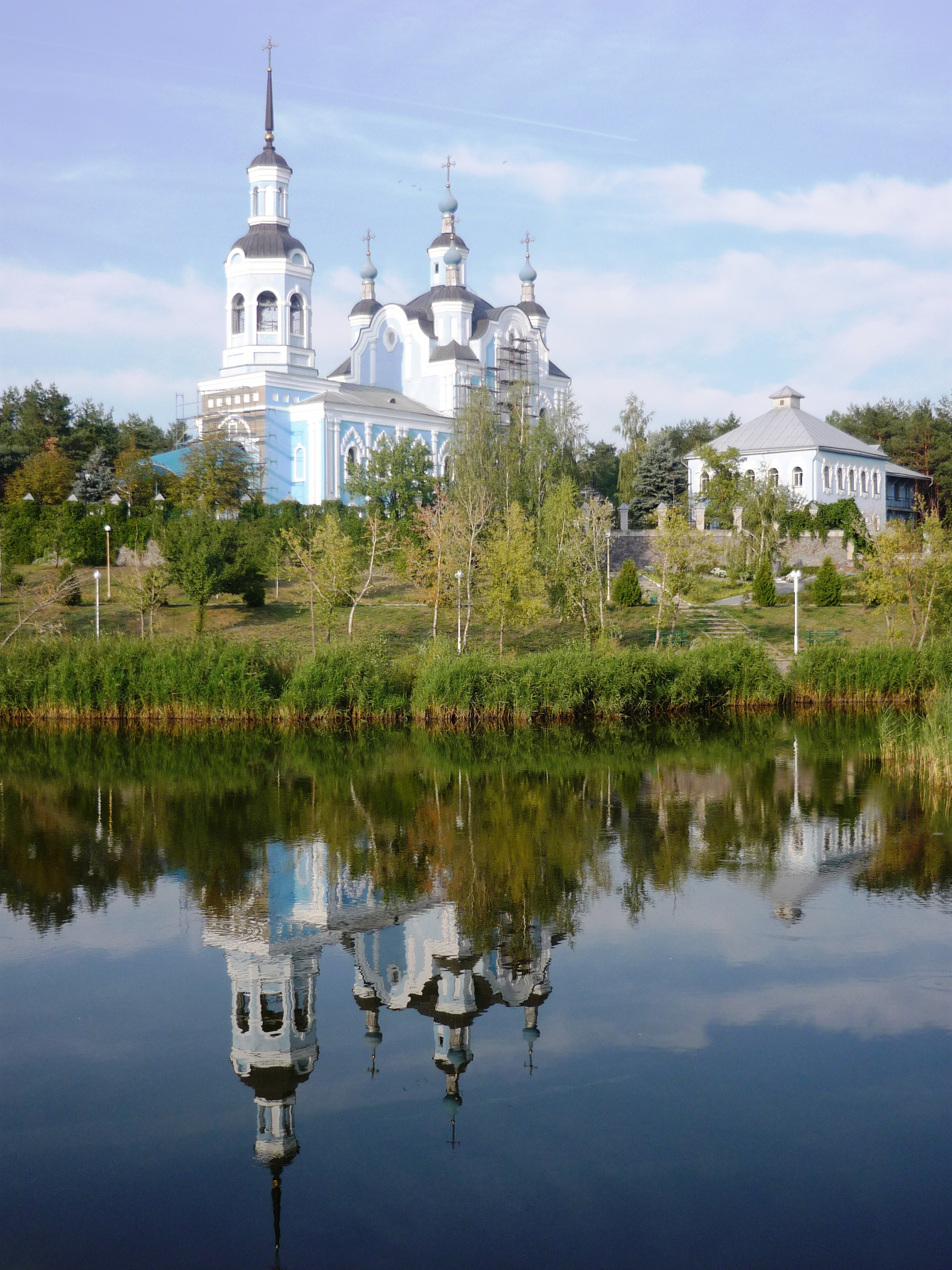
- Saint Nicholas Cathedral

- Flag Coat of arms
- Interactive map of Horishni Plavni
- Location within Ukraine Location within Poltava Oblast
- Coordinates: 49°01′N 33°40′E
- Country: Ukraine
- Oblast: Poltava Oblast
- Raion: Kremenchuk Raion
- Hromada: Horishni Plavni urban hromada
- Founded: 1960
- Town status: 1972

Area
  - Total: 7.73 km^{2} (2.98 sq mi)

Population (2022)
  - Total: 49,854
  - Density: 6,450/km^{2} (16,700/sq mi)
- Time zone: UTC+2, UTC+3
- Postal code: 39800-39890
- Area code: +380 5348
- Website: www.hp-rada.gov.ua

Horishni Plavni (Ukrainian: Горішні Плавні, pronounced [ɦoˈr⁽ʲ⁾iʃn⁽ʲ⁾i ˈplɑu̯n⁽ʲ⁾i]), before 2016 known as Komsomolsk-na-Dnipri (Комсомольськ-на-Дніпрі) or simply Komsomolsk (Комсомольськ), is a purpose-built mining city in central Ukraine, located on the left bank of the Dnieper, in Kremenchuk Raion of Poltava Oblast, practically conurbated with the larger neighboring city of Kremenchuk. Horishni Plavni hosts the administration of Horishni Plavni urban hromada, one of the hromadas of Ukraine. Population: 49,854 (2022 estimate).

== History ==
Founded in 1960 as Komsomolsk-na-Dnipri, the city was purposely planned and built as the residential and civic area for the Poltava Mining and Extraction Combinat (now controlled by the Ferrexpo) - the most important iron ore-mining company in Ukraine. 80% of the city residents are employed by the mining industry. There are two gigantic open pit mines and several spoil tips on the city territory, to the north-east and south of the residential area.

The industry is served by several railway stations. However, the passenger service was discontinued and the city relies on intercity and suburban bus links. The combinat operates its own freight river port.

Due to the profitability of mining, small city of Horishni Plavni usually ranks high in all-Ukraine city rankings of birth rate, living standards, (un)employment and housing.

On 15 May 2015 President of Ukraine Petro Poroshenko signed a bill into law that started a six months period for the removal of communist monuments and the mandatory renaming of settlements with names related to Communism. On 19 May 2016, the Verkhovna Rada adopted the decision to rename Komsomolsk to Horishni Plavni.

Until 18 July 2020, Horishni Plavni was designated as a city of oblast significance. As part of the administrative reform of Ukraine, which reduced the number of raions of Poltava Oblast to four, the city was merged into Kremenchuk Raion.

== Demographics ==
As of the 2001 Ukrainian census, Horishni Plavni (formerly Komsomolsk-na-Dnipri) had a population of 51,832 inhabitants. Despite having the highest percentage of ethnic Russians in its population of any major settlement in the entire Poltava Oblast, the city is overwhelmingly Ukrainian, while also hosting small Belarusian, Armenian and Moldovan communities. In terms of spoken languages, the Ukrainian language is dominant, yet a large Russophone minority also exists in the city. The exact ethnic and linguistic composition was as follows:

Ethnic groups in Horishni Plavni
	percent
Ukrainians	78.39%
Russians	19.55%
Belarusians	0.82%
Armenians	0.20%
Moldovans	0.14%
Tatars	0.12%
Poles	0.08%
others	0.70%

Languages in Horishni Plavni
	percent
Ukrainian	72.2%
Russian	27.2%
Belarusian	0.2%
Armenian	0.1%
Romanian	0.1%
others	0.2%

== Gallery ==
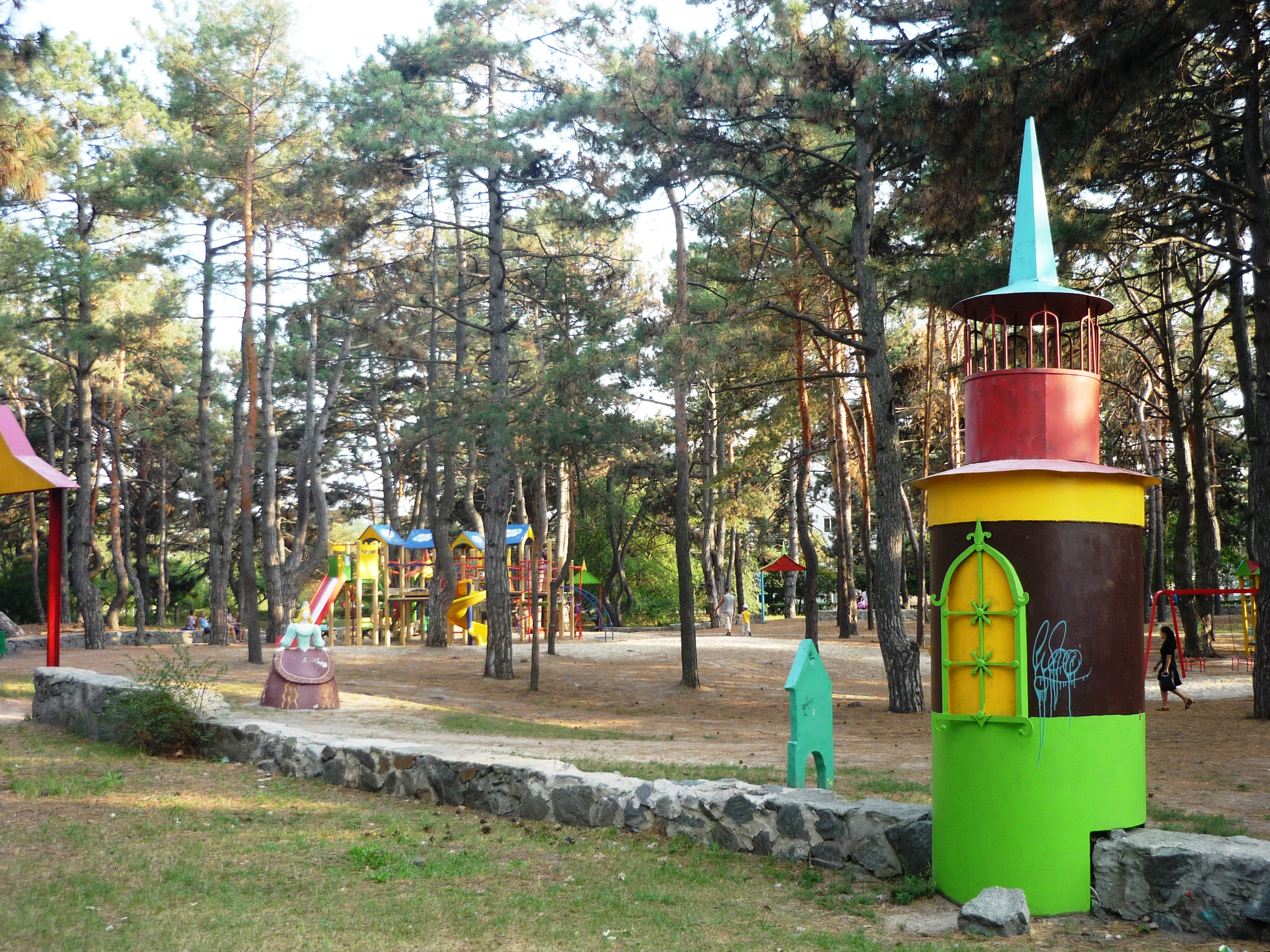
City park

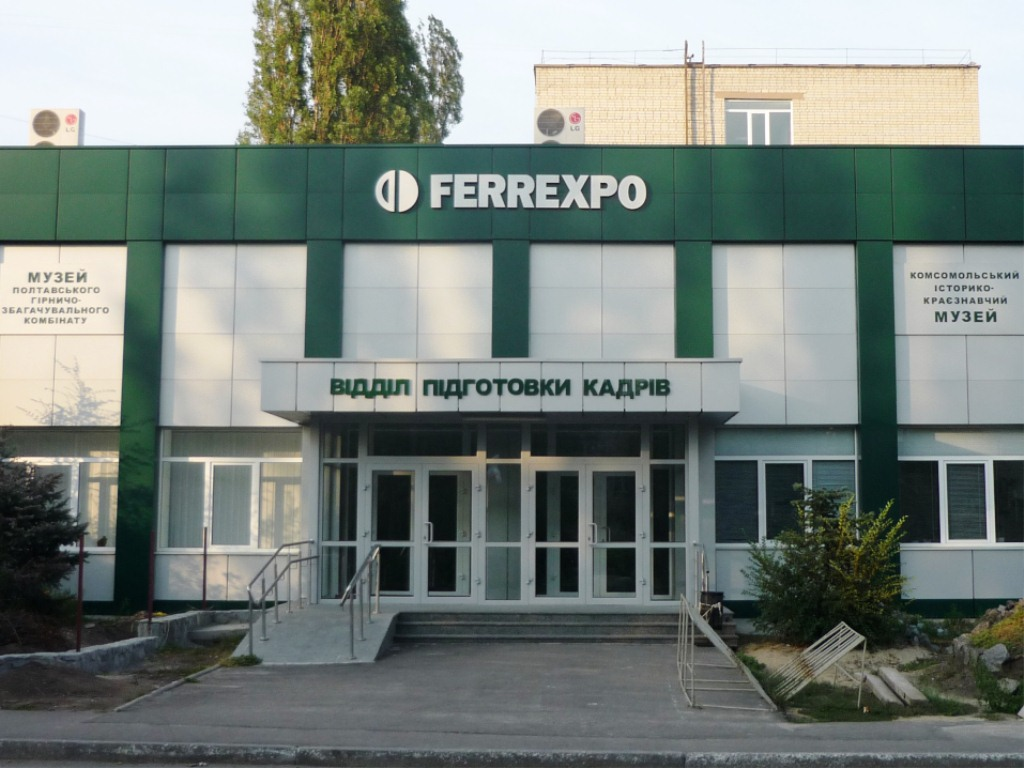
Museum of Horishni Plavni

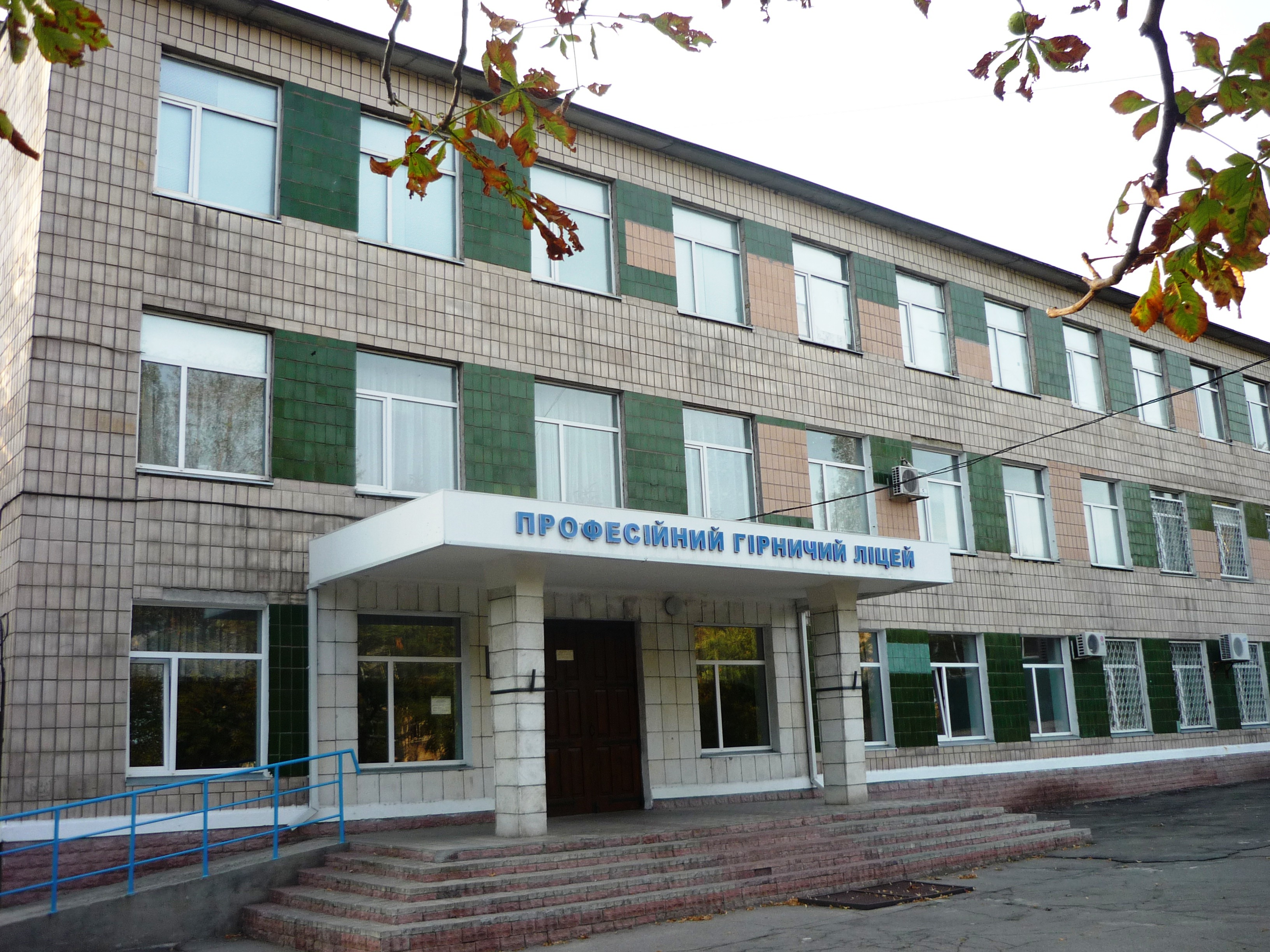
Mining and construction liceum

== Notable people ==
- Iryna Amshennikova (born 1986), Ukrainian swimmer
- Oleksandr Popov (born 1960), Ukrainian businessman and politician
- Lyubov Sirota (born 1956), Ukrainian poet and writer

== See also ==
- Kostyantyn Zhevago
