= Ocheretuvate, Poltava Oblast =

Village in Semenivka Raion, Poltava Oblast, Ukraine

Coordinates: 49.566°N 33.1473°E

Ocheretuvate (Ukrainian: Очеретувате) is a village in Kremenchuk Raion, Poltava Oblast, Ukraine.
