= Hlobyne urban hromada =

Hlobyne urban hromada Глобинська міська громада
- Hromada
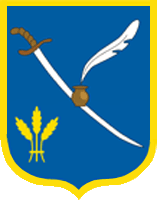
- Coat of arms
- Interactive map of Hlobyne urban hromada
- Country: Ukraine
- Oblast: Poltava Oblast
- Raion: Kremenchuk Raion
- Admin. center: Hlobyne

Area
  - Total: 1,198.9 km^{2} (462.9 sq mi)

Population (2018)
  - Total: 25,747
  - Density: 21.476/km^{2} (55.621/sq mi)
- CATOTTG code: UA53020010000035494
- Settlements: 65
- Cities: 1
- Villages: 64
- Website: https://globynska-gromada.gov.ua/

Hlobyne urban territorial hromada (Ukrainian: Глобинська міська територіальна громада, romanized: Hlobynska miska terytorialna hromada) is one of the hromadas of Ukraine, located in Kremenchuk Raion, Poltava Oblast. Its administrative centre is the city of Hlobyne. The community is based on part of the territory of the former Hlobyne Raion in Poltava Oblast.

Established on August 13, 2015, through the merger of the Hlobyne City Council and the Babychivka, Borysy, Zhuky, Opryshky, and Pyrohy village councils of Hlobyne Raion.

The hromada has a total area of 1,197.727 km^{2} (462.445 mi^{2}), and a population of 25,747 (as of 2020).

== Composition ==
In addition to one city (Hlobyne), there are 64 villages within the hromada:

- Babychivka
- Bahny
- Balabushyni Verby
- Borysy
- Bytakove Ozero
- Cherevani
- Demchenky
- Demydivka
- Fedorivka
- Hlushkove Druhe
- Hlyboke
- Huliaipole
- Ivanove Selyshche
- Kolomytsivka
- Kordubanove
- Koreshchyna
- Kovnirivshchyna
- Kupievate
- Lamane
- Loza
- Lubenshchyna
- Lukashivka
- Maidanivka
- Makhnivka
- Malynivka
- Manylivske
- Manzheliia
- Marine
- Naberezhne
- Novobudova
- Novodorozhnie
- Novoselivka
- Novyi Vyselok
- Oboznivka
- Opryshky
- Pavlivka
- Petrivka
- Popivka
- Pustoviitove
- Puzykove
- Pyrohy
- Radalivka
- Romanivka
- Ruda
- Semymohyly
- Shepelivka
- Shevchenky
- Sirenky
- Staryi Khutir
- Stepove
- Syrotenky
- Troitske
- Turbaii
- Ustymivka
- Velyki Krynky
- Vesela Dolyna
- Vitky
- Yaroshi
- Zamozhne
- Zarichne
- Zemlianky
- Zhorniaky
- Zhuky
- Zubani
