= Pyvykha =

Geological and historical protection area in Ukraine

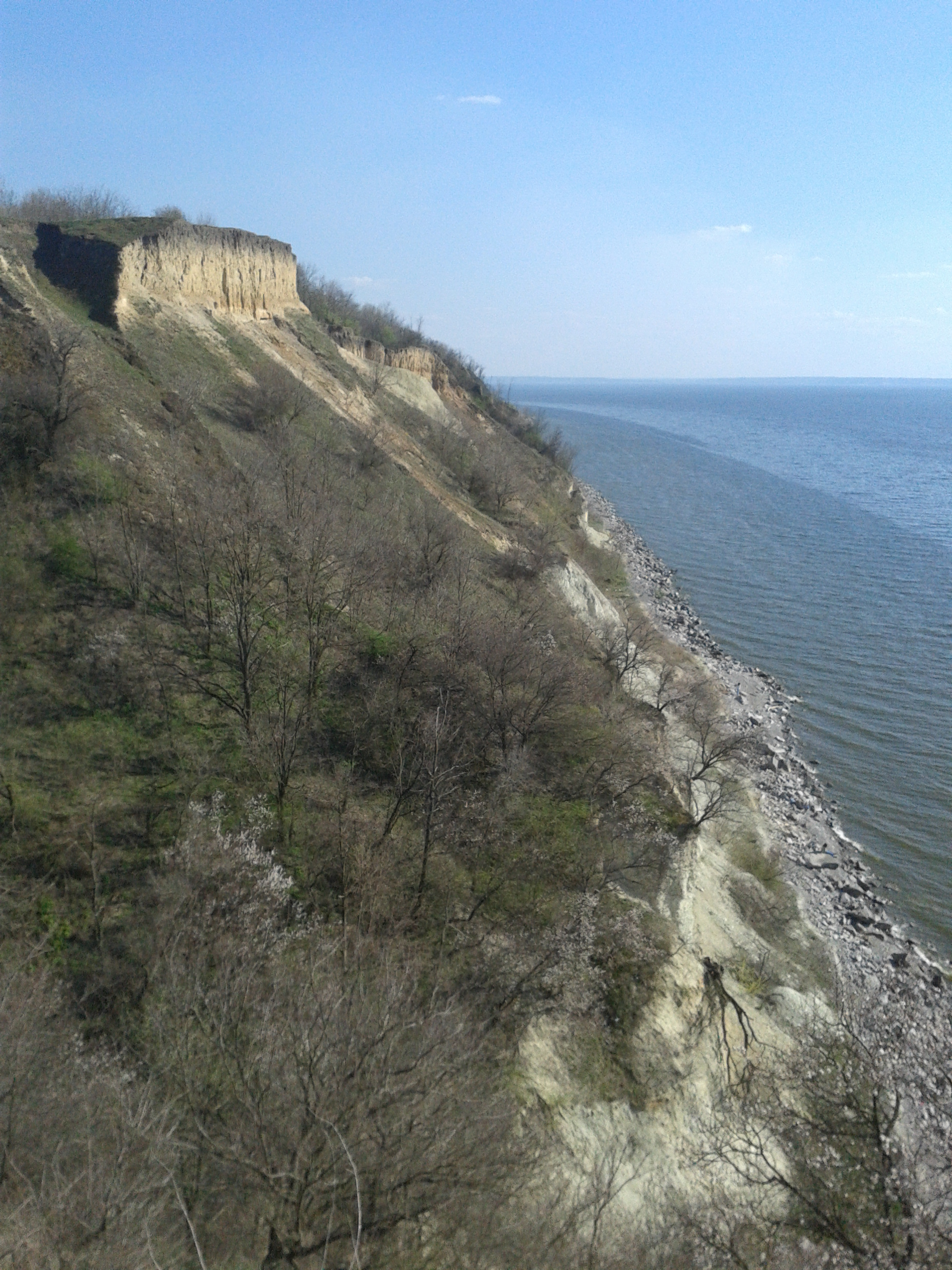
- View of Pyvykha

Highest point
- Elevation: 169 m (554 ft)
- Coordinates: 49°11′36″N 33°7′32″E

Dimensions
- Area: 165.2 hectares (408 acres)

Naming
- Native name: Пивиха (Ukrainian)

Geography
- Location within Ukraine
- Location: Hradyzk, Poltava Oblast, Ukraine
- Country: Ukraine

Pyvykha (Ukrainian: Пивиха) is a 169-metre (554 ft) peak located in Poltava Oblast, Ukraine. The hill is a geological and historical protection area.

== Geography ==
Pyvykha is located on the southern outskirts of the urban-type settlement of Hradyzk on the left bank of the Dnieper, which was dammed to form the Kremenchuk Reservoir.

== History ==
Pyvykha was formed as a result of a glacial system located here during the Dnieper Ice Age (corresponds to the Saale glaciation in northern Central Europe). Outcrops of blue marl, a rare siliceous clay component, are found in the hill.

Since the 17th century, there was a monastery on Pyvykha, which became an important religious and political center and played an important role in the fight against Uniatism. In 1786, the monastery was closed and secularized.

After the damming of the Dnieper to form the Kremenchuk Reservoir in 1960, whose waves can reach a height of seven meters during a storm, the Pyvykha exposed to gradual destruction. The hill has had the status of a local natural monument since 1969. The area of the nature reserve is 165.2 hectares (408 acres).
