= Kozelshchyna Raion =

Former subdivision of Poltava Oblast, Ukraine

Kozelshchyna Raion Козельщинський район
- Raion
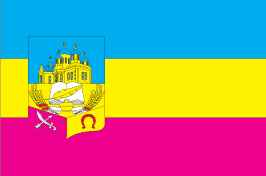
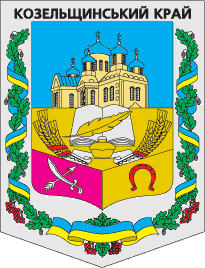
- Flag Coat of arms

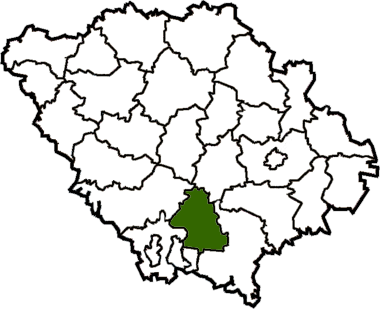
- Country: Ukraine
- Oblast: Poltava Oblast
- Established: 7 March 1923
- Disestablished: 18 July 2020
- Admin. center: Kozelshchyna
- Subdivisions: List: — city councils; — settlement councils; — rural councils; Number of localities: — cities; — urban-type settlements; 76 — villages; — rural settlements

Government
  - Governor: Sergei Sushko (as of May 2012)

Area
  - Total: 930 km^{2} (360 sq mi)

Population (2020)
  - Total: 18,380
  - Density: 20/km^{2} (51/sq mi)
- Time zone: UTC+02:00 (EET)
  - Summer (DST): UTC+03:00 (EEST)
- Postal index: 39100—39152
- Area code: 380-5342
- Website: https://web.archive.org/web/20081203204303/http://www.adm-pl.gov.ua/kozelch

Kozelshchyna Raion (Ukrainian: Козельщинський район, romanized: Kozel'ščyns'kyj rajon) was a raion (district) in Poltava Oblast in central Ukraine. The raion's administrative center was the urban-type settlement of Kozelshchyna. The other urban-type settlement in the raion was Nova Haleshchyna (Ukrainian: Нова Галещина). The raion was abolished and its territory was merged into Kremenchuk Raion on 18 July 2020 as part of the administrative reform of Ukraine, which reduced the number of raions of Poltava Oblast to four. The last estimate of the raion population was 18,380 (2020 est.)

At the time of disestablishment, the raion consisted of two hromadas:

- Kozelshchyna settlement hromada with the administration in Kozelshchyna;
- Nova Haleshchyna settlement hromada with the administration in the urban-type settlement of Nova Haleshchyna.

Important rivers within the Kozelshchyna Raion include the Psel.
