= Nedoharky =

Rural locality in Poltava Oblast, Ukraine

Nedoharky Недогарки
- Village
- Interactive map of Nedoharky
- Coordinates: 49°17′N 33°27′E
- Country: Ukraine
- Oblast: Poltava Oblast
- Raion: Kremenchuk Raion
- Founded: 1729

Population
  - Total: 1,768
- Postal code: 39722
- Area code: +380 -5366
- Website: Ukrainian Parliament page

Nedoharky (Ukrainian: Недогарки) is a village in Kremenchuk Raion, Poltava Oblast (province) of central Ukraine. It belongs to Pishchane rural hromada, one of the hromadas of Ukraine. The village of Nedoharki is located near the dam of the Kremenchuk reservoir on the left bank of the Dnieper River. Grain crops and vegetables are grown in the village. Roads and a railway pass through the Nedoharki.

== History ==
Three settlements of the Neolithic period (IV millennium BC), six settlements of the Bronze Age (II-I millennium BC) were discovered near the village. The first written mention of Nedogharki was in 1729 about the farm of the Vlasivska Hundred of the Myrhorod Regiment. There was a small wooden church of the 19th century and a church-parish Sunday school.

== Geography ==
The village is located at around 49°1′7″N 33°2′7″E. The village of Nedoharki is the center of the Nedoharkivskyi starostynskyi district of the Pishchanskyi territorial community, which includes the villages of Panivka, Pashchenivka, Rokytne-Donivka. The village of Nedoharki is located near the dam of the Kremenchuk reservoir on the left bank of the Dnieper River. The village is located in the Dnieper lowland, in the forest steppe nature zone. There is a pine forest near the village.

The climate of the Nedoharki is temperate continental. The average temperature in January is −3.7 °C, in July it is +21.4 °C, the amount of precipitation is 480–580 mm/year, which falls mainly in the summer as rain. The temperate continental climate is favorable for agricultural activities. Grain crops and vegetables are grown on the chernozem of the village. There is an oil mill, a mill, and a bakery.

Minerals of the village territory: clay, sand.

The national highway Boryspil-Dnipro-Zaporizhzhia (N-08), the interregional highway T-1713 and the railway running in the direction of Poltava-Kremenchuk pass near the village.
