= Kamiani Potoky =

Rural locality in Poltava Oblast, Ukraine

Kamiani Potoky Кам'яні Потоки
- Village
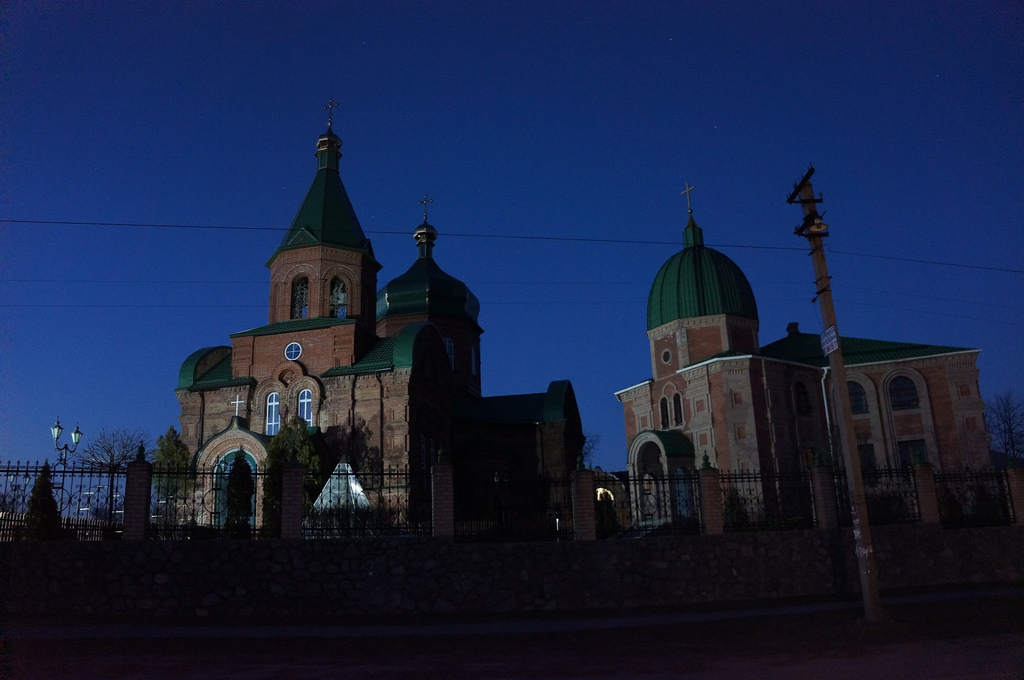

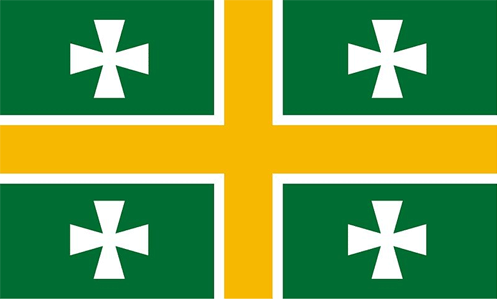
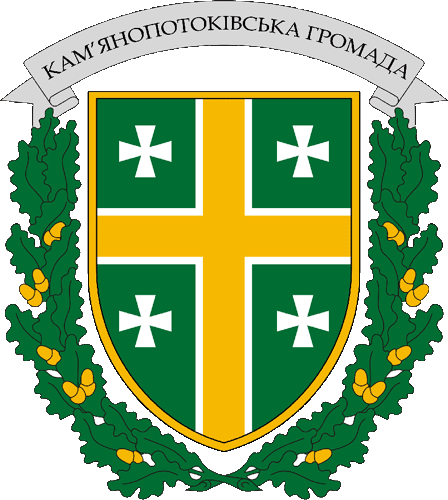
- Flag Coat of arms

- Location within Ukraine Location within Poltava Oblast
- Coordinates: 48°59′24″N 33°31′12″E
- Country: Ukraine
- Oblast: Poltava Oblast
- Raion: Kremenchuk Raion
- Founded: 1600s

Population
  - Total: 3,662
- Postal code: 39763
- Area code: 8-05366
- Website: Ukrainian Parliament page

Kamiani Potoky (Ukrainian: Кам'яні Потоки) is a village in Kremenchuk Raion, Poltava Oblast (province) of central Ukraine. It hosts the administration of Kamiani Potoky rural hromada, one of the hromadas of Ukraine. The Kamiani Potoky is located on the right bank of the Dnieper River, in a forest-steppe natural zone.The village population is 3,919 people.

== History ==
Kamiani Potoky village was founded in the early 17th century by Cossacks. Village residents took part in the 1624 rebellion under Zhmailo.

== Geography ==
The Kamiani Potoky is located 18 km from the city of Kremenchuk, lies on the right bank of the Dnieper River, upstream the village of Sadky adjoins, downstream the village of Chikalivka is located. Near the village of Kamiani Potoky the Kamianske Reservoir begins.

The climate of the village is temperate continental. The average temperature in January is −3.7 °C, in July it is +21.4 °C, the amount of precipitation is 480–580 mm/year, which falls mainly in the summer as rain.The Kamiani Potoky is located in a forest-steppe natural zone.

== Transport ==
The national highway M 22 Poltava - Oleksandria passes through the Kamiani Potoky. The village is located 9 km from the Kryukiv-na-Dnipro railway station.

== Туризм ==
There are architectural monuments on the territory of the Kamiani Potoky: the Holy Intercession Church built in 1913, the premises of the former zemstvo school of the early 20th century. "Granodiorite Outcrops" is a geological natural monument of local importance in Ukraine located on the territory of the village.

== Famous people ==
Zakhar Petrovich Yalov is a Ukrainian wrestler, world champion in freestyle wrestling.
