= Khruli =

Rural locality in Poltava Oblast, Ukraine

Khruli Хрулі
- Location of Khruli
- Coordinates: 50°19′43″N 33°24′9″E
- Country: Ukraine
- Oblast: Poltava Oblast
- Raion: Myrhorod Raion
- Founded: 1649; 377 years ago

Area
  - Total: 0.941 km^{2} (0.363 sq mi)
- Elevation: 104 m (341 ft)

Population (2015)
  - Total: 121
- Time zone: UTC+2 (EET)
  - Summer (DST): UTC+3 (EET)
- Postal code: 37260
- Area code: +380 5356

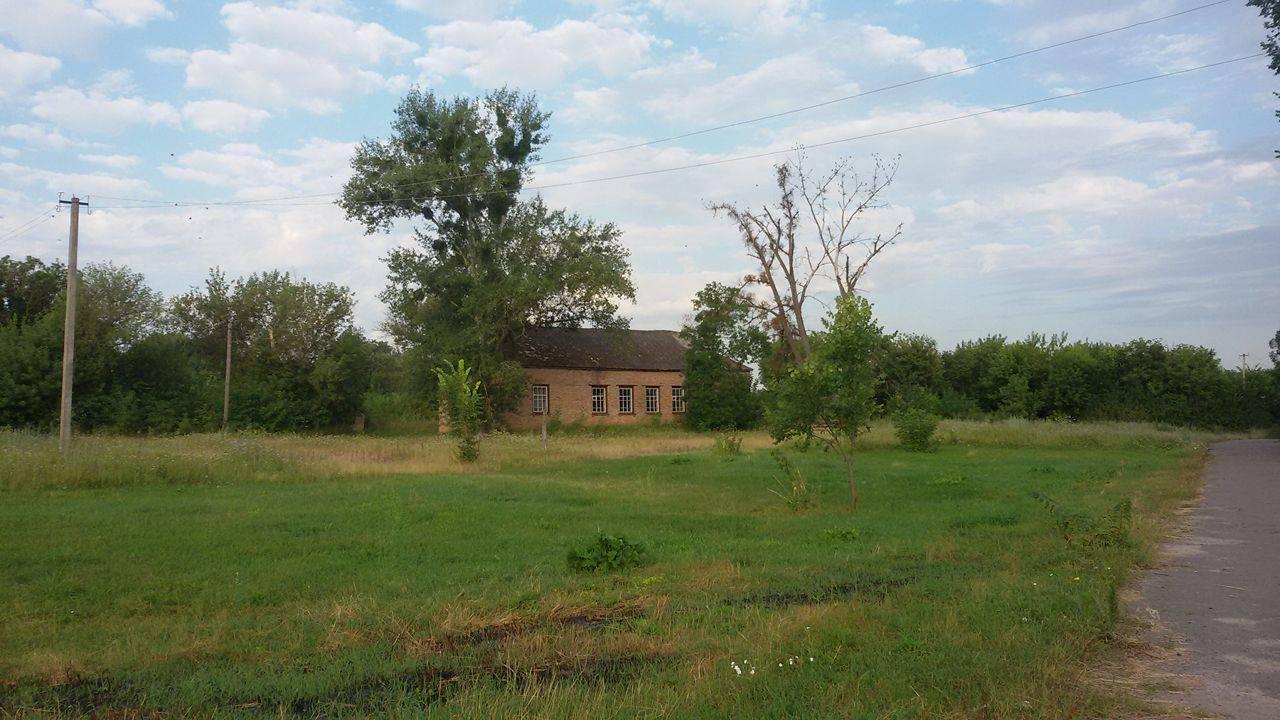
Center of the village Khruli

Khruli (Ukrainian: Хрулі) is a village in northeastern Ukraine, specifically in Myrhorod Raion of Poltava Oblast. It belongs to Zavodske urban hromada, one of the hromadas of Ukraine.

Until 18 July 2020, Khruli belonged to Lokhvytsia Raion. The raion was abolished in July 2020 as part of the administrative reform of Ukraine, which reduced the number of raions of Poltava Oblast to four. The area of Lokhvytsia Raion was merged into Myrhorod Raion.
