= Hlobyne Raion =

Former subdivision of Poltava Oblast, Ukraine

Hlobyne Raion Глобинський район
- Raion
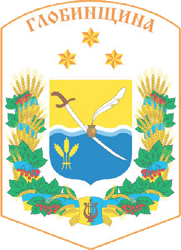
- Flag Coat of arms

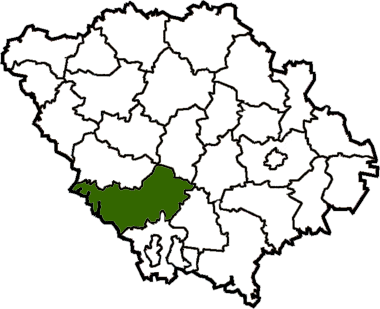
- Coordinates: 49°22′43.881″N 33°9′38.3508″E
- Country: Ukraine
- Oblast: Poltava Oblast
- Established: 7 March 1923
- Disestablished: 18 July 2020
- Admin. center: Hlobyne
- Subdivisions: List: — city councils; — settlement councils; — rural councils; Number of localities: — cities; — urban-type settlements; 92 — villages; — rural settlements

Government
  - Governor: Valeriy Vedmid

Area
  - Total: 2,500 km^{2} (970 sq mi)

Population (2020)
  - Total: 41,270
  - Density: 17/km^{2} (43/sq mi)
- Time zone: UTC+02:00 (EET)
  - Summer (DST): UTC+03:00 (EEST)
- Postal index: 39000—39081
- Area code: +380-5365
- Website: Official homepage

Hlobyne Raion (Ukrainian: Глобинський район) was a raion (district) in Poltava Oblast in central Ukraine. The raion's administrative center was the city of Hlobyne. The raion was abolished on 18 July 2020, as part of the administrative reform of Ukraine, which reduced the number of raions of Poltava Oblast to four. The area of Hlobyne Raion was merged into Kremenchuk Raion. The last estimate of the raion population was 41,270 (2020 est.)

The district includes the Ustymivka Dendrological Park (of national importance) and protected areas of local importance, such as the Manzheliyivka Nature Reserve and Mount Pyvykha.

At the time of disestablishment, the raion consisted of two hromadas:

- Hlobyne urban hromada with the administration in Hlobyne;
- Hradyzk settlement hromada with the administration in the urban-type settlement of Hradyzk.
