= Kozelshchyna =

Rural settlement in Poltava Oblast, Ukraine

Kozelshchyna Козельщина
- Rural settlement
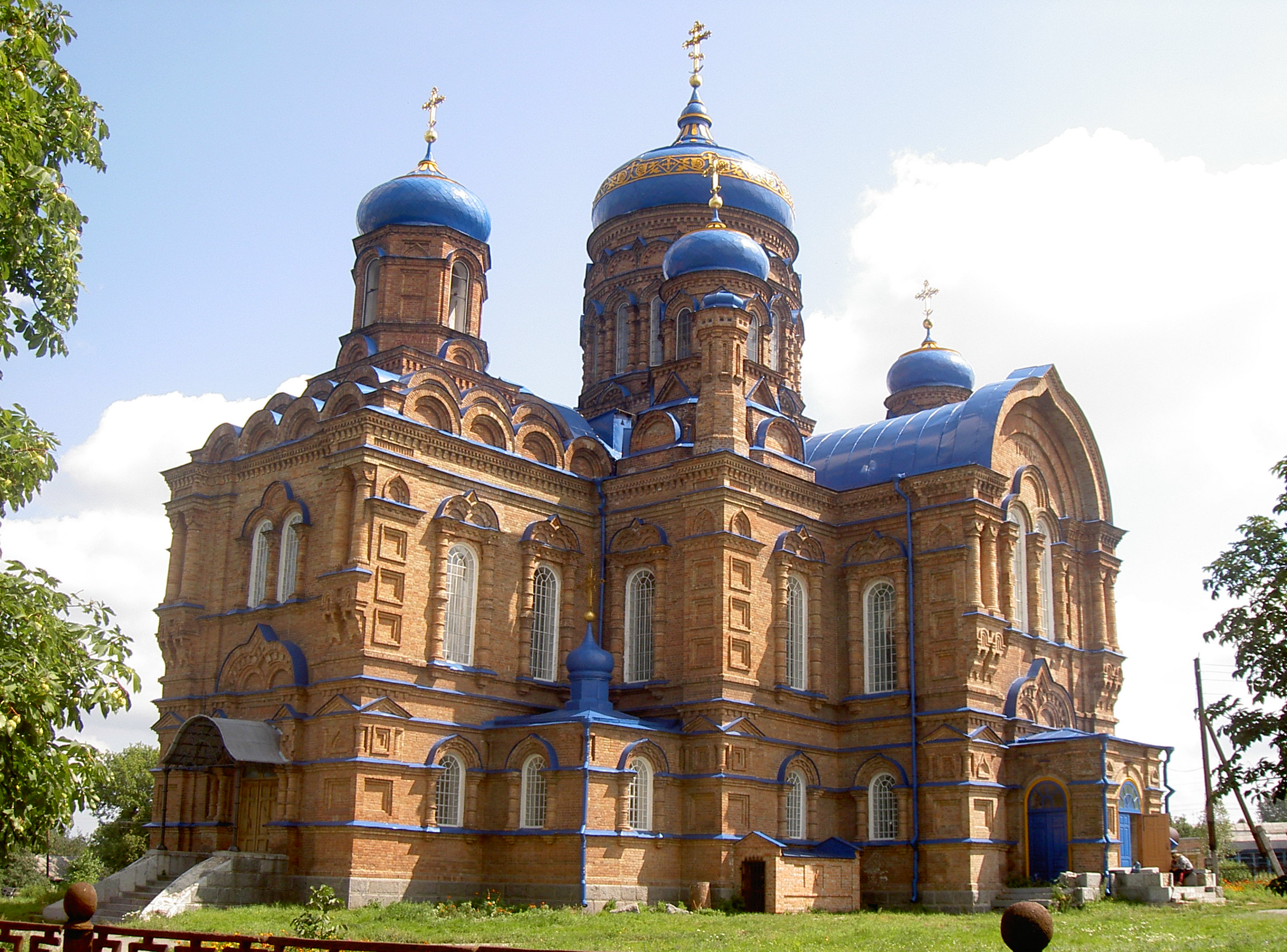
- Nativity Cathedral

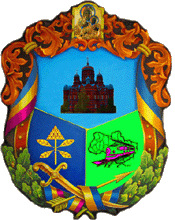
- Coat of arms

- Location of Kozelshchyna in Poltava Oblast Location of Kozelshchyna in Ukraine
- Coordinates: 49°13′N 33°51′E
- Country: Ukraine
- Oblast: Poltava Oblast
- Raion: Kremenchuk Raion
- Founded: 1923

Area
  - Total: 30 km^{2} (12 sq mi)
- Elevation: 158 m (518 ft)

Population (2022)
  - Total: 3,464
  - Density: 120/km^{2} (300/sq mi)
- Time zone: UTC+2 (EET)
  - Summer (DST): UTC+3 (EET)
- Postal code: 39100
- Area code: +380 5342

Kozelshchyna (Ukrainian: Козельщина) is a rural settlement in Kremenchuk Raion, Poltava Oblast, central Ukraine, located 77 km from Poltava. Kozelshchyna hosts the administration of Kozelshchyna settlement hromada, one of the hromadas of Ukraine. Population: 3,464 (2022 estimate) Kozelschyna is also a railway station, and located close to the highway M22-E584.

== Geography ==
Kozelshchyna lies in the geographical area of Dnieper Lowland.

== History ==
Kozelschyna was founded in the early 18th century. In 1718, Poltava colonel I. Chernyak sent Cossacks of the Kobeliaky sotnia to settle the area. In 1764 the settlement became part of Novorossiya Governorate, and a pikemen's regiment was stationed there. From 1775 to 1783 it belonged to the Novi Sanzhary district of the same governorate. Starting from 1796, it belonged to the Poltava district of Little Russia Governorate.

With the formation of Poltava Governorate in 1802, Kozelschyna was incorporated by that administrative unit in 1803 as part of Kobeliaky district. A railway connection was established in 1870, with some impact on the rural development. Soviet rule was first established hin Kozelshchyna in January 1918. On March 7, 1923, Kozelschyna was detached from Kremenchuk Raion and became the seat of Bryhadyrivka district. From February 1932 to September 1937, Kozelschyna was part of the Kharkiv region, and on 26 April 1933, the Bryhadyrivka district was renamed into Kozelshchyna district. Since September 1937, Kozelschyna has been part of Poltava region. On 25 October 1938, it was granted urban-type settlement status.

Until 18 July 2020, Kozelshchyna was the administrative center of Kozelshchyna Raion. The raion was abolished in July 2020 as part of the administrative reform of Ukraine, which reduced the number of raions of Poltava Oblast to four. The area of Kozelshchyna Raion was merged into Kremenchuk Raion. On 26 January 2024, a new law entered into force which abolished the status of urban-type settlement, and Kozelshchyna became a rural settlement.

== Economy ==
Kozelshchyna is a local centre of food industry.

== Attractions ==
Among the attractions in Kozelschyna are the cathedral and monastery of the Nativity of the Virgin, built in 1882 by V.I. and S.M. Kapnist, as a thankful gift for the recovery of their daughter Maria from a serious illness. In 1900-1906, the brick church became a monastery. In 1929, the monastery was closed and the cathedral was turned into a theater, meanwhile its cells were used by a bio-engineering school, hospital and other institutions. The monastery restored its activities in 1942 - 1949, and was finally returned to the Orthodox community in 1990.
