= Kremenchuk Raion =

Subdivision of Poltava Oblast, Ukraine

Kremenchuk Raion Кременчуцький район
- Raion
- Flag Coat of arms

- Coordinates: 49°7′6.3696″N 33°28′28.4808″E
- Country: Ukraine
- Oblast: Poltava Oblast
- Established: 1939
- Admin. center: Kremenchuk
- Subdivisions: 12 hromadas

Area
  - Total: 6,101.3 km^{2} (2,355.7 sq mi)

Population (2022)
  - Total: 387,200
  - Density: 63.46/km^{2} (164.4/sq mi)
- Time zone: UTC+02:00 (EET)
  - Summer (DST): UTC+03:00 (EEST)
- Postal index: 315000
- Area code: 380-5366
- Website: http://kremenchuk.adm-pl.gov.ua

Kremenchuk Raion (Ukrainian: Кременчуцький район, romanized: Kremenchutskyi raion) is a raion (district) in Poltava Oblast, central Ukraine. The raion's administrative center is the city of Kremenchuk. Population: 387,200 (2022 estimate).

On 18 July 2020, as part of the administrative reform of Ukraine, the number of raions of Poltava Oblast was reduced to four, and the area of Kremenchuk Raion was significantly expanded. The January 2020 estimate of the raion population was 38,814 (2020 est.).

Important rivers within Kremenchuk Raion include the Psel and the Dnieper. The raion was established in 1939.

== Administrative division ==
=== Current ===
After the reform in July 2020, the raion consisted of 12 hromadas:

- Hlobyne urban hromada with the administration in the city of Hlobyne, transferred from Hlobyne Raion;
- Hradyzk settlement hromada with the administration in the rural settlement of Hradyzk, transferred from Hlobyne Raion;
- Horishni Plavni urban hromada with the administration in the city of Horishni Plavni, transferred from city of the oblast significance of Horishni Plavni and retained from Kremenchuk Raion;
- Kamiani Potoky rural hromada with the administration in the selo of Kamiani Potoky, retained from Kremenchuk Raion;
- Kozelshchyna settlement hromada with the administration in the rural settlement of Kozelshchyna, transferred from Kozelshchyna Raion;
- Kremenchuk urban hromada with the administration in the city of Kremenchuk, transferred from city of the oblast significance of Kremenchuk and retained from Kremenchuk Raion;
- Nova Haleshchyna settlement hromada with the administration in the rural settlement of Nova Haleshchyna, transferred from Kozelshchyna Raion;
- Omelnyk rural hromada with the administration in the selo of Omelnyk, retained from Kremenchuk Raion;
- Pishchane rural hromada with the administration in the selo of Pishchane, retained from Kremenchuk Raion;
- Pryshyb rural hromada with the administration in the selo of Pryshyb, retained from Kremenchuk Raion.

=== Before 2020 ===
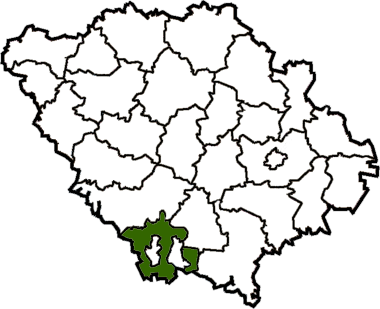
Kremenchuk Raion in Poltava Oblast before 2020

Before the 2020 reform, the raion consisted of four hromadas,

- Kamiani Potoky rural hromada with the administration in Kamiani Potoky;
- Omelnyk rural hromada with the administration in Omelnyk;
- Pishchane rural hromada with the administration in Pishchane;
- Pryshyb rural hromada with the administration in Pryshyb.

== Settlements ==
- Biletskivka
- Bondari
- Burty
- Checheleve
- Nova Znam"ianka
- Chykalivka
- Demydivka
- Dzerzhynske
- Fedorenky
- Horyslavtsi
- Hun'ky
- Kamiani Potoky
- Karpivka
- Keleberda
- Kindrivka
- Kobeliachok
- Korzhivka
- Kovali
- Kovalivka
- Kramarenky
- Kremenchuk
- Kryvushi
- Lytvynenky
- Makhnivka
- Maksymivka
- Mala Kokhnivka
- Malamivka
- Malyky
- Mayborodivka
- Mykhaialenky
- Mylovydivka
- Myrne
- Naidenivka
- Nedoharky
- Novoselivka
- Olefirivka
- Omelnyk
- Onyschenky
- Ostaptsi
- Paschenivka
- Panivka
- Petrashivka
- Pidhirne
- Pishchane
- Potoky
- Pryshyb
- Pykhal'schina
- Pysarschyna
- Pystovity
- P"iatykhatky
- Radochynu
- Revivka
- Robotivka
- Roiove
- Rokytne
- Rokytne-Donivka
- Romanky
- Sadky
- Salivka
- Samusiivka
- Sherbaky
- Sherbukhy
- Sosnivka
- Stara Biletskivka
- Stepivka
- Varakytu
- Vasylenky
- Vilna Tereshkivka
- Voskobiinyky
- Yalyntsi
- Yaremivka
- Yerystivka
- Zapsillia
- Zaruddia

== Geography ==
Kremenchuk Raion is located in the eastern part of Poltava Oblast, on the Dnieper Lowland, on the left bank of the Dnieper Valley. The relief of the district is an undulating plain, cut by river valleys, ravines, and gullies.

The climate of the Kremenchuk Raion is temperate continental. The average temperature in January is −3.7 °C, in July it is +21.4 °C, the amount of precipitation is 480–580 mm/year, which falls mainly in the summer as rain.

The landscapes are represented by forest-steppe. Chernozems dominate the territory of the Kremenchuk Raion.

The Psel and Sula rivers, left tributaries of the Dnieper, flow through the district. The river in the floodplain has many oxbow lakes and artificial lakes.

Kremenchuk Raion has reserves of clay, gneiss, granite, iron ore. The territory of the district is located in the Kremenchuk iron ore region.

The Lower Sula National Nature Park is located in Kremenchuk Raion. The natural park is a nesting and resting place for many species of migratory birds, including: yellow heron, black-headed gull, sandpiper, magpie, stilt, and steppe warbler, which are listed in the Red Book of Ukraine. The Kremenchuk Plavni Regional Landscape Park is part of the Emerald Network, and also has granites and granodiorites of the Lower Proterozoic and Archean on its territory.
