= Administrative divisions of Poltava Oblast =

Poltava Oblast is subdivided into districts (raions) which are subdivided into territorial communities (hromadas).

== Current ==
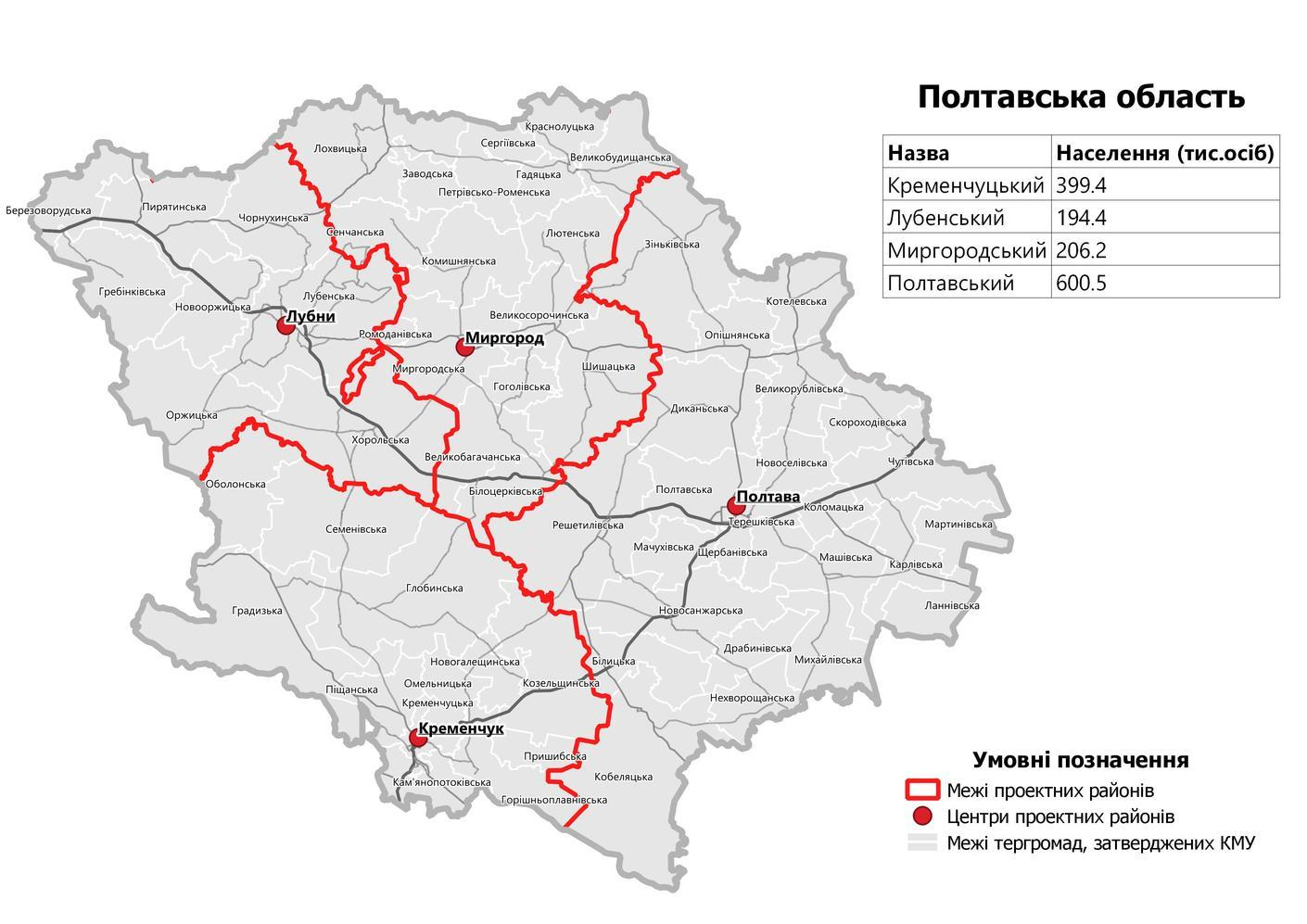
Raions of Poltava Oblast as of August 2020.

On 18 July 2020, the number of districts was reduced to four. These are:

1. Kremenchuk (Кременчуцький район), the center is in the town of Kremenchuk;
2. Lubny (Лубенський район), the center is in the town of Lubny;
3. Myrhorod (Миргородський район), the center is in the town of Myrhorod;
4. Poltava (Полтавський район), the center is in the city of Poltava.

Poltava Oblast
As of January 1, 2022
Number of districts (райони)	4
Number of hromadas (громади)	60

== Administrative divisions until 2020 ==
Raions of Poltava Oblast as of June 2020. The city of Poltava is shown in dark blue.

Before 2020, Poltava Oblast was subdivided into 31 regions: 24 districts (raions) and 6 city municipalities (mis'krada or misto), officially known as territories governed by city councils.

- Cities under the oblast's jurisdiction:
  - Poltava (Полтава), the administrative center of the oblast
  - Hadiach (Гадяч)
  - Horishni Plavni (Горішні Плавні), formerly Komsomolsk
  - Kremenchuk (Кременчук)
  - Lubny (Лубни)
  - Myrhorod (Миргород)
- Districts (raions):
  - Chornukhy (Чорнухинський район)
    - Urban-type settlements under the district's jurisdiction:
      - Chornukhy (Чорнухи)
  - Chutove (Чутівський район)
    - Urban-type settlements under the district's jurisdiction:
      - Chutove (Чутове)
      - Skorokhodove (Скороходове), formerly Artemivka
  - Dykanka (Диканський район)
    - Urban-type settlements under the district's jurisdiction:
      - Dykanka (Диканька)
  - Hadiach (Гадяцький район)
  - Hlobyne (Глобинський район)
    - Cities under the district's jurisdiction:
      - Hlobyne (Глобине)
    - Urban-type settlements under the district's jurisdiction:
      - Hradyzk (Градизьк)
  - Hrebinka (Гребінківський район)
    - Cities under the district's jurisdiction:
      - Hrebinka (Гребінка)
  - Karlivka (Карлівський район)
    - Cities under the district's jurisdiction:
      - Karlivka (Карлівка)
  - Khorol (Хорольський район)
    - Cities under the district's jurisdiction:
      - Khorol (Хорол)
  - Kobeliaky (Кобеляцький район)
    - Cities under the district's jurisdiction:
      - Kobeliaky (Кобеляки)
    - Urban-type settlements under the district's jurisdiction:
      - Bilyky (Білики)
  - Kotelva (Котелевський район)
    - Urban-type settlements under the district's jurisdiction:
      - Kotelva (Котельва)
  - Kozelshchyna (Козельщинський район)
    - Urban-type settlements under the district's jurisdiction:
      - Kozelshchyna (Козельщина)
      - Nova Haleshchyna (Нова Галещина)
  - Kremenchuk (Кременчуцький район)
  - Lokhvitsia (Лохвицький район)
    - Cities under the district's jurisdiction:
      - Lokhvytsia (Лохвиця)
      - Zavodske (Заводське), formerly Chervonozavodske
  - Lubny (Лубенський район)
  - Mashivka (Машівський район)
    - Urban-type settlements under the district's jurisdiction:
      - Mashivka (Машівка)
  - Myrhorod (Миргородський район)
    - Urban-type settlements under the district's jurisdiction:
      - Komyshnia (Комишня)
      - Romodan (Ромодан)
  - Novi Sanzhary (Новосанжарський район)
    - Urban-type settlements under the district's jurisdiction:
      - Novi Sanzhary (Нові Санжари)
  - Orzhytsia (Оржицький район)
    - Urban-type settlements under the district's jurisdiction:
      - Novoorzhytske (Новооржицьке)
      - Orzhytsia (Оржиця)
  - Poltava (Полтавський район)
  - Pyriatyn (Пирятинський район)
    - Cities under the district's jurisdiction:
      - Pyriatyn (Пирятин)
  - Reshetylivka (Решетилівський район)
    - Cities under the district's jurisdiction:
      - Reshetylivka (Решетилівка)
  - Semenivka (Семенівський район)
    - Urban-type settlements under the district's jurisdiction:
      - Semenivka (Семенівка)
  - Shyshaky (Шишацький район)
    - Urban-type settlements under the district's jurisdiction:
      - Shyshaky (Шишаки)
  - Velyka Bahachka (Великобагачанський район)
    - Urban-type settlements under the district's jurisdiction:
      - Hoholeve (Гоголеве)
      - Velyka Bahachka (Велика Багачка)
  - Zinkiv (Зіньківський район)
    - Cities under the district's jurisdiction:
      - Zinkiv (Зіньків)
    - Urban-type settlements under the district's jurisdiction:
      - Opishnia (Опішня)
