= List of cities in Poltava Oblast =

Location of cities in Poltava Oblast

There are 16 populated places in Poltava Oblast, Ukraine, that have been officially granted city status (Ukrainian: місто, romanized: misto) by the Verkhovna Rada, the country's parliament. Settlements with more than 10,000 people are eligible for city status, although the status is typically also granted to settlements of historical or regional importance. As of 5 December 2001, the date of the first and only official census in the country since independence, (Note: As of 11 July 2023) the most populous city in the oblast was the regional capital, Poltava, with a population of 317,998 people, while the least populous city was Zavodske, with 9,024 people. After the enactment of decommunization laws, two cities within the oblast were renamed in 2016 for their former names' connection to people, places, events, and organizations associated with the Soviet Union. The renamed cities Horishni Plavni and Zavodske were previously named Komsomolsk and Chervonozavodske, respectively.

From independence in 1991 to 2020, six cities in the oblast were designated as cities of regional significance (municipalities), which had self-government under city councils, while the oblast's remaining 10 cities were located amongst 24 raions (districts) as cities of district significance, which are subordinated to the governments of the raions. On 18 July 2020, an administrative reform abolished and merged the oblast's raions and cities of regional significance into four new, expanded raions. The four raions that make up the oblast are Kremenchuk, Lubny, Myrhorod, and Poltava.

== List of cities ==
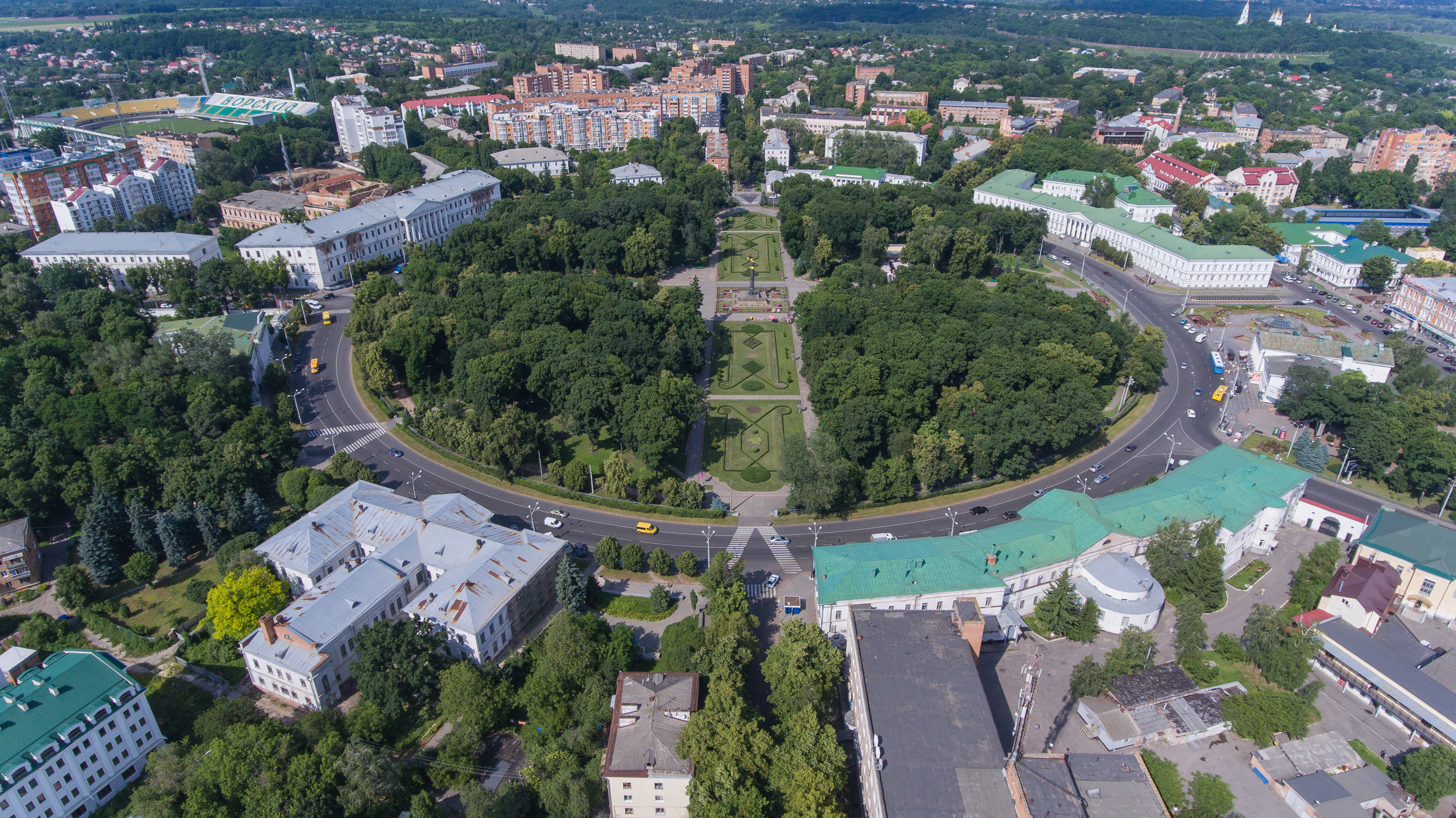
Poltava, capital and most populous city in Poltava Oblast

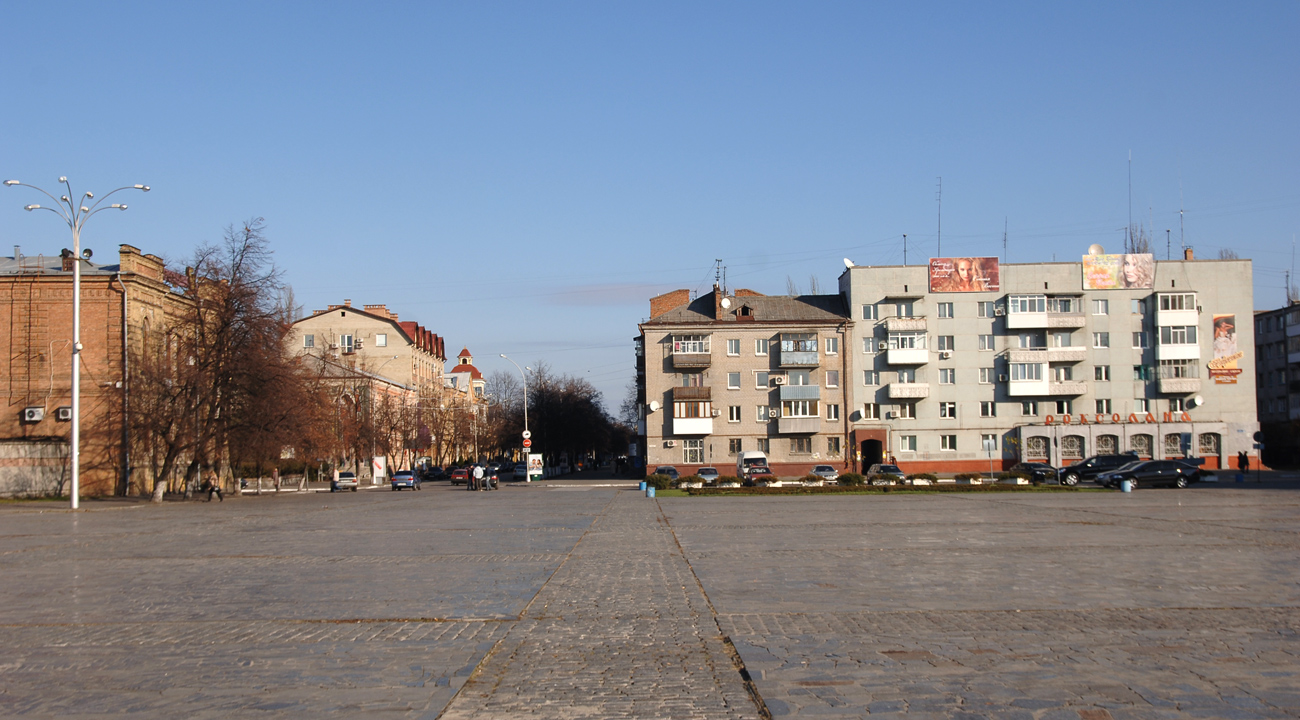
Kremenchuk, second most populous city in the oblast and a major industrial center

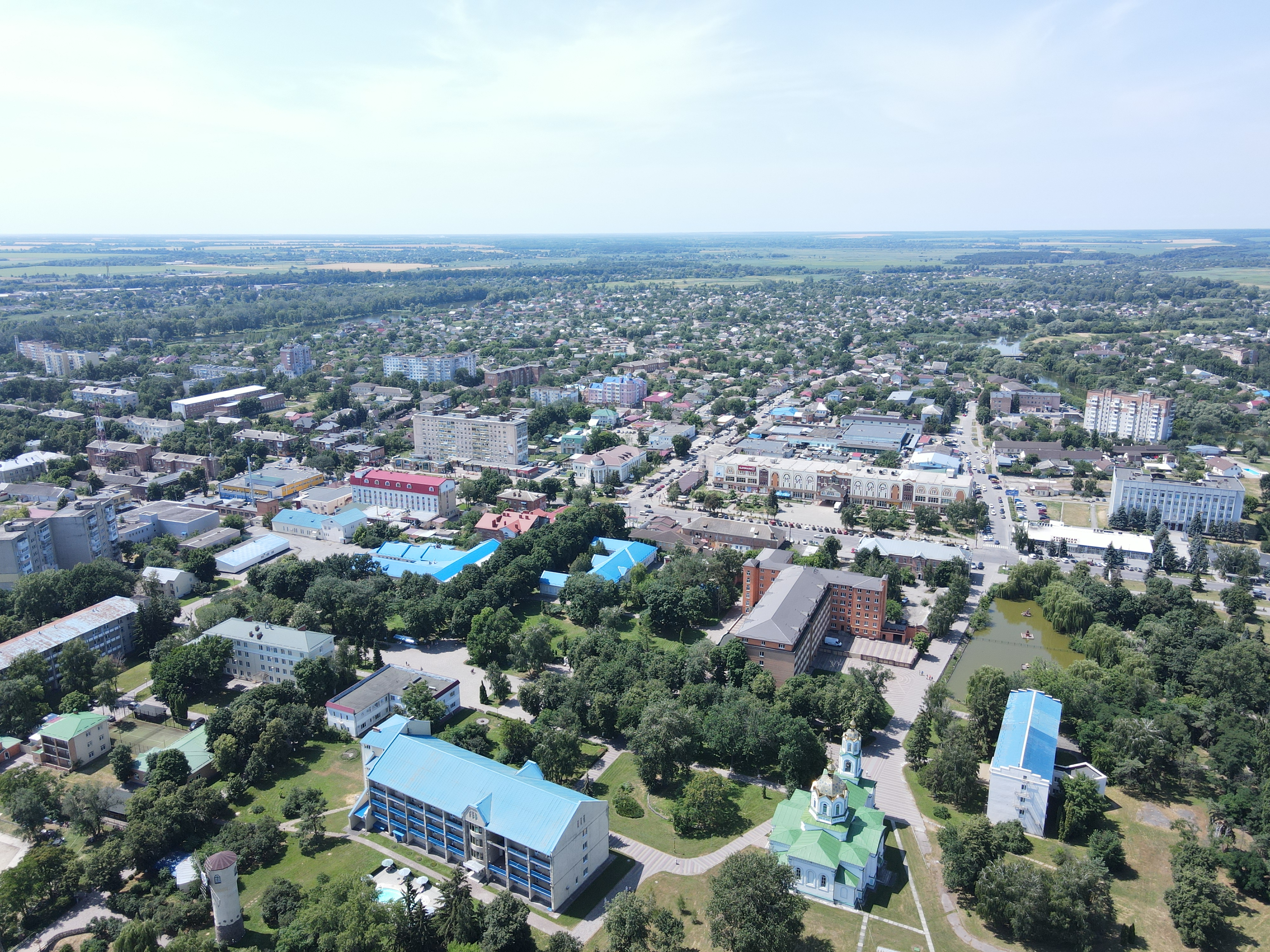
Myrhorod, a resort town and an industrial center

Cities in Poltava Oblast
Name	Name (in Ukrainian) (Note: Links to the Ukrainian Wikipedia articles for each city)	Raion (district)	Population (2022 estimates)	Population (2001 census)	Population change
Hadiach	Гадяч	Myrhorod	22,851	22,698	+0.67%
Hlobyne	Глобине	Kremenchuk	8,955	12,902	−30.59%
Horishni Plavni	Горішні Плавні	Kremenchuk	49,854	51,740	−3.65%
Hrebinka	Гребінка	Lubny	10,541	11,662	−9.61%
Karlivka	Карлівка	Poltava	14,045	17,995	−21.95%
Khorol	Хорол	Lubny	12,540	14,753	−15.00%
Kobeliaky	Кобеляки	Poltava	9,465	12,076	−21.62%
Kremenchuk	Кременчук	Kremenchuk	215,271	234,073	−8.03%
Lokhvytsia	Лохвиця	Myrhorod	11,014	12,389	−11.10%
Lubny	Лубни	Lubny	44,089	52,572	−16.14%
Myrhorod	Миргород	Myrhorod	37,886	42,886	−11.66%
Poltava	Полтава	Poltava	279,593	317,998	−12.08%
Pyriatyn	Пирятин	Lubny	14,988	16,664	−10.06%
Reshetylivka	Решетилівка	Poltava	9,021	9,457	−4.61%
Zavodske	Заводське	Myrhorod	7,712	9,024	−14.54%
Zinkiv	Зіньків	Poltava	9,168	10,577	−13.32%

== See also ==
- List of cities in Ukraine
