= Novoorzhytske =

Rural locality in Poltava Oblast, Ukraine

Novoorzhytske Новооржицьке
- Rural settlement
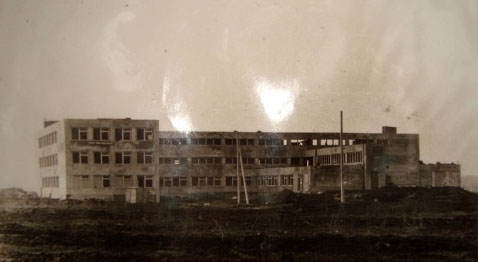

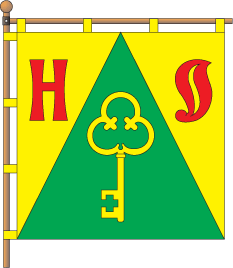
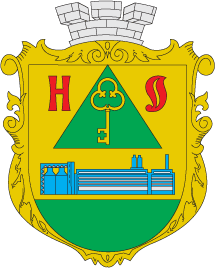
- Flag Coat of arms

- Location in Poltava Oblast Location in Ukraine
- Country: Ukraine
- Oblast: Poltava Oblast
- Raion: Lubny Raion

Population (2022)
  - Total: 1,689
- Time zone: UTC+2 (EET)
  - Summer (DST): UTC+3 (EEST)

Novoorzhytske (Ukrainian: Новооржицьке; Russian: Новооржицкое) is a rural settlement in Lubny Raion, Poltava Oblast, Ukraine. It is located on the Viazivets, a tributary of the Sliporid in the drainage basin of the Dnieper. Novoorzhytske hosts the administration of Novoorzhytske settlement hromada, one of the hromadas of Ukraine. Population: 1,689 (2022 estimate).

== History ==
Until 18 July 2020, Novoorzhytske belonged to Orzhytsia Raion. The raion was abolished in July 2020 as part of the administrative reform of Ukraine, which reduced the number of raions of Poltava Oblast to four. The area of Orzhytsia Raion was merged into Lubny Raion.

Until 26 January 2024, Novoorzhytske was designated urban-type settlement. On this day, a new law entered into force which abolished this status, and Novoorzhytske became a rural settlement.

== Economy ==
=== Transportation ===
The closest railway station, about 5 kilometres (3.1 mi) northeast, is Vyly, on the railway connecting Poltava and Kyiv via Hrebinka. There is some passenger traffic through the station.

The settlement has access to highway M03 connecting Kyiv and Kharkiv via Poltava.
