= Hrebinka Raion =

Former subdivision of Poltava Oblast, Ukraine

Hrebinka Raion Гребінківський район
- Raion
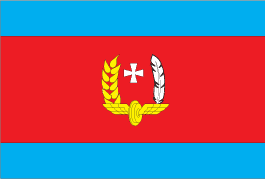
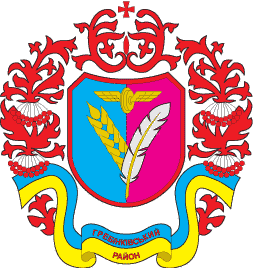
- Flag Coat of arms

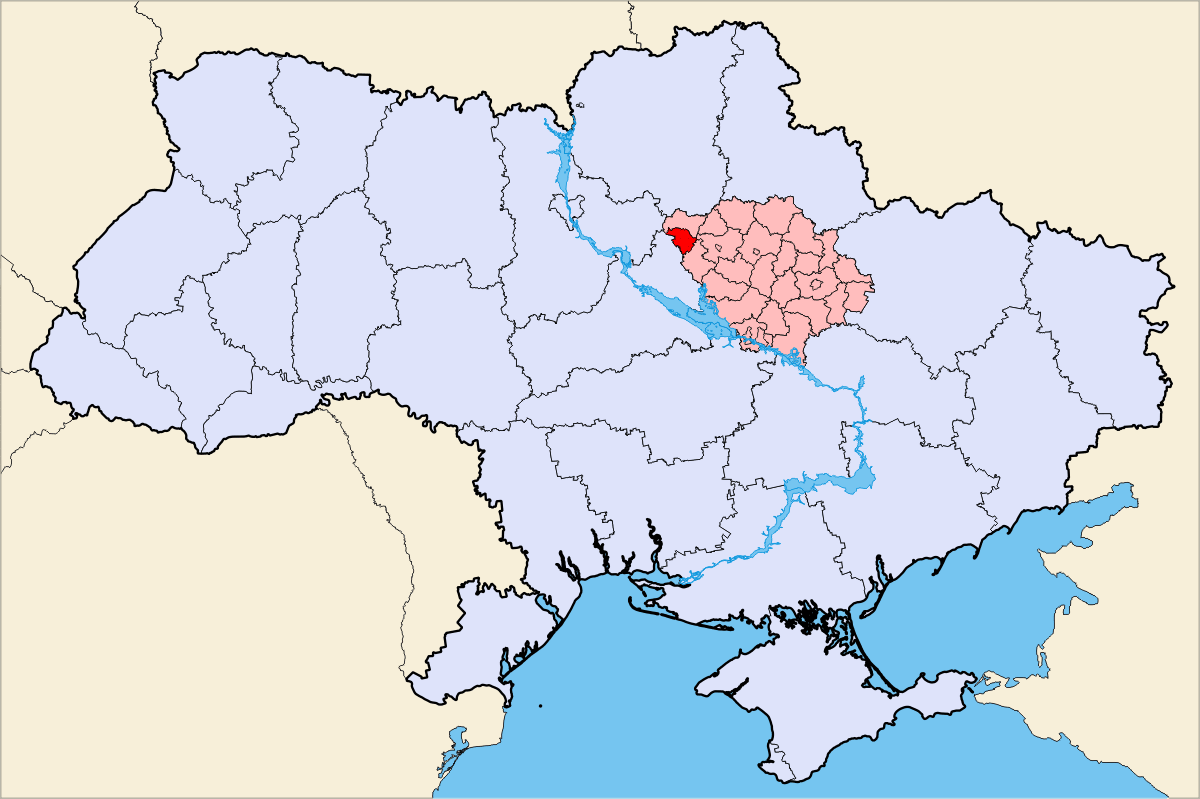
- Coordinates: 50°6′46.3026″N 32°25′3.9498″E
- Country: Ukraine
- Oblast: Poltava Oblast
- Established: 25 February 1935
- Disestablished: 18 July 2020
- Admin. center: Hrebinka
- Subdivisions: List: — city councils; — settlement councils; — rural councils; Number of localities: — cities; — urban-type settlements; 42 — villages; — rural settlements

Government
  - Governor: Vadym Fedorenko

Area
  - Total: 595 km^{2} (230 sq mi)

Population (2020)
  - Total: 21,601
  - Density: 36.3/km^{2} (94.0/sq mi)
- Time zone: UTC+02:00 (EET)
  - Summer (DST): UTC+03:00 (EEST)
- Area code: +380
- Website: Official homepage

Hrebinka Raion (Ukrainian: Гребінківський район, romanized: Hrebinkivs'kyj rajon) was a raion (district) in Poltava Oblast in central Ukraine. The raion's administrative center was the city of Hrebinka. The raion was abolished and its territory was merged into Lubny Raion on 18 July 2020 as part of the administrative reform of Ukraine, which reduced the number of raions of Poltava Oblast to four. The last estimate of the raion population was 21,601 (2020 est.)

Important rivers within the Hrebinkivskyi Raion included the Sliporod and the Orzhytsya. The raion was officially founded on February 25, 1935, updated on December 8, 1966.

At the time of disestablishment, the raion consisted of one hromada, Hrebinka urban hromada with the administration in Hrebinka.

== Settlements ==
- Beresivka
- Hryhorivka
- Korniyivka
- Korovayi
- Kulashyntsi
- Mayorstchyna
- Maryanivka
- Natalivka
- Ovsyuky
- Oleksandrivka
- Oleksiyivka
- Rudka
- Serbynivka
- Slobodo-Petrivka
- Sliporid-Ivanivka
- Stukalivka
- Tarasivka
- Ulyanovka
