= Orzhytsia =

Rural locality in Poltava Oblast, Ukraine

Orzhytsia Оржиця
- Rural settlement
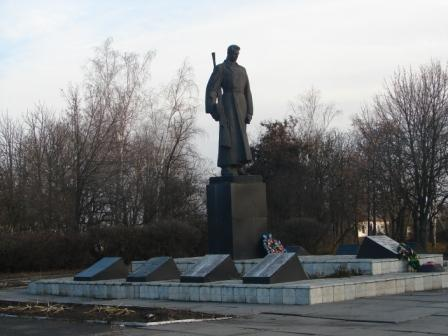

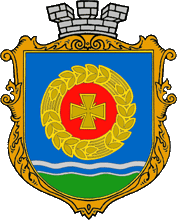
- Flag Coat of arms

- Location in Poltava Oblast Location in Ukraine
- Country: Ukraine
- Oblast: Poltava Oblast
- Raion: Lubny Raion

Population (2022)
  - Total: 3,378
- Time zone: UTC+2 (EET)
  - Summer (DST): UTC+3 (EEST)

Orzhytsia (Ukrainian: Оржиця, Russian: Оржица) is a rural settlement located in Lubny Raion of Poltava Oblast in Ukraine. It is located on the Orzhytsia, a right tributary of the Sula, a tributary of the Dnieper. Orzhytsia hosts the administration of Orzhytsia settlement hromada, one of the hromadas of Ukraine. Population: 3,378 (2022 estimate).

== History ==
Until 18 July 2020, Orzhytsia served as the administrative center of Orzhytsia Raion. The raion was abolished in July 2020 as part of Ukraine's administrative reform, which reduced the number of raions in Poltava Oblast to four. The area of Orzhytsia Raion was merged into Lubny Raion.

Until 26 January 2024, Orzhytsia was designated urban-type settlement. On this day, a new law entered into force which abolished this status, and Orzhytsia became a rural settlement.

== Economy ==
=== Transportation ===
Orzhytsia is connected by local roads with Lubny and Zolotonosha.

The closest railway station is in Lubny.
