= Chornukhy Raion =

Former subdivision of Poltava Oblast, Ukraine

Chornukhy Raion Чорнухинський район
- Raion
- Flag Coat of arms

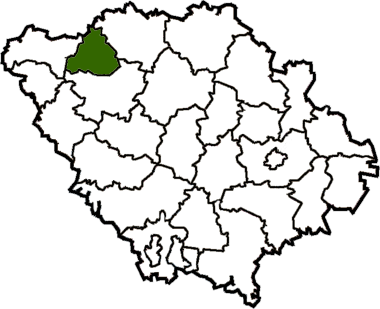
- Coordinates: 50°15′48.9852″N 32°55′58.0614″E
- Country: Ukraine
- Oblast: Poltava Oblast
- Established: 7 March 1923
- Disestablished: 18 July 2020
- Admin. center: Chornukhy
- Subdivisions: List: — city councils; — settlement councils; — rural councils; Number of localities: — cities; — urban-type settlements; 41 — villages; — rural settlements

Government
  - Governor: Borys Lysenko

Area
  - Total: 682 km^{2} (263 sq mi)

Population (2020)
  - Total: 10,568
  - Density: 15.5/km^{2} (40.1/sq mi)
- Time zone: UTC+02:00 (EET)
  - Summer (DST): UTC+03:00 (EEST)
- Area code: +380
- Website: Official homepage

Chornukhy Raion (Ukrainian: Чорнухинський район, romanized: Čornuxyns'kyj rajon) was a raion (district) in Poltava Oblast in central Ukraine. The raion's administrative center was the urban-type settlement of Chornukhy. The raion was abolished and its territory was merged into Lubny Raion on 18 July 2020 as part of the administrative reform of Ukraine, which reduced the number of raions of Poltava Oblast to four. The last estimate of the raion population was 10,568 (2020 est.).

Important rivers within the Dykanskyi Raion included the Vorskla and the Orzhytsia rivers.

At the time of disestablishment, the raion consisted of one hromada, Chornukhy settlement hromada with the administration in Chornukhy.

== Settlements ==
- Bohodarivka
- Chornukhy
- Kharsiky
