= Chornukhy =

Rural locality in Poltava Oblast, Ukraine

Chornukhy Чорнухи
- Rural settlement
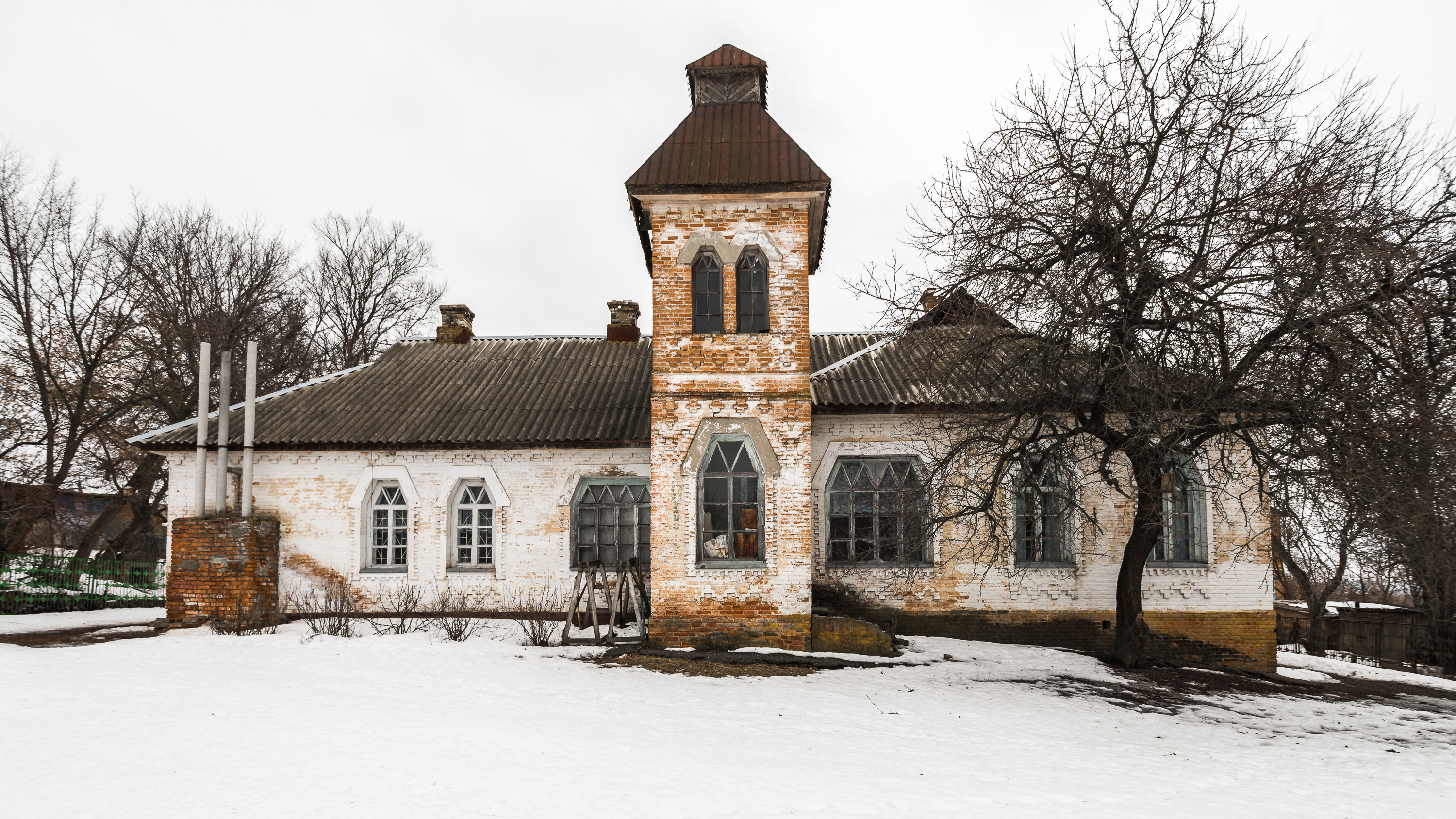
- School building erected according to a project by Opanas Slastion

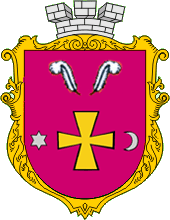
- Coat of arms

- Location within Poltava Oblast Location within Ukraine
- Coordinates: 50°16′24″N 32°56′18″E
- Country: Ukraine
- Oblast: Poltava Oblast
- Raion: Lubny Raion
- Founded: 1261

Area
  - Total: 6.90 km^{2} (2.66 sq mi)

Population (2022)
  - Total: 2,384
- Time zone: UTC+2 (EET)
- Postal code: 37101
- Area code: 5340

Chornukhy (Ukrainian: Чорнýхи; Russian: Чернýхи) is a rural settlement in Lubny Raion, Poltava Oblast, central Ukraine. It hosts the administration of Chornukhy settlement hromada, one of the hromadas of Ukraine. Chornukhy is known as the birthplace of philosopher Hryhorii Skovoroda; a monument testifies to this.

The nearest railway station is Pyriatyn located 38 km (24 mi) away. Chornukhy is located on the river Mnoha. The territory of the settlement covers an area of 690 hectares. Village bus and a bus connection from Poltava, Kyiv, Lubny, Pyriatyn and Lokhvytsia. The total population of Chornukhy according to the Census on 1 January 2002 was 3138 inhabitants (2900 in 1984). Current population: 2,3,843 (2022 estimate).

== History ==
The year the town was founded is unknown. Chornukhy is first mentioned in 1261. It has been assumed that Chornukhy was initially a fortress built to protect against the Pechenegs and the Cumans and was established at the time of the Kievan Rus' state, but at the end of the 13th century it was destroyed by Mongol-Tatars. The next mention of the town appears in 1641. In 1647, Chornukhy was identified among the possessions of Prince Vyshnevetsky in Poltava.

In 1648 Chornukhy became a centesimal town Lubny Regiment.

In 1971, the town received the status of urban-type settlement.

Until 18 July 2020, Chornukhy was the administrative center of Chornukhy Raion. The raion was abolished in July 2020 as part of the administrative reform of Ukraine, which reduced the number of raions of Poltava Oblast to four. The area of Chornukhy Raion was merged into Lubny Raion.

Until 26 January 2024, Chornukhy was designated urban-type settlement. On this day, a new law entered into force which abolished this status, and Chornukhy became a rural settlement.

== Economy ==
The economy of the district is based on agriculture, which specializes in grain, sugar beets, sunflowers, milk, meat. The main producers of agricultural products are 15 agricultural limited liability companies and three private farms, OJSC Chornuhyptytsia and 10 farms.

Local facilities include: the Hotel Mnoha, the Poltava branch office of Bank Poltavabank, the Lubensky Chornukhiv Branch State Savings Bank of Ukraine, a Poltava Branch Office of the Aval Bank, "Privatbank". There are two ATMs.

== Social conditions ==
The area contains 22 secondary schools, the Voronkivskyy branch Lazirkivsky vocational school N46, the Central District and two district hospitals, district polyclinics, 19 health posts, three medical dispensaries. On cultural and educational level care residents of the area in 1911 rural houses of culture, 14 rural clubs, a concert hall (opened in 2006 at the former cinema), the Central Regional Library, an Adult University, a regional library for children, 20 rural branch libraries and a children's music school. Chornukhynskyi literary memorial museum and 4 rural public museums are highly valued local cultural institutions. The district Culture House was recently destroyed by fire.

The newspaper "New job" is published twice a week since January 1932.

In the area there are nine religious communities, four Ukrainian Orthodox Churches and four houses of prayer. An Orthodox Church of Moscow Patriarchate in the city park continues to be constructed.

== Famous inhabitants ==
- Gregory Skovoroda, Ukrainian philosopher, poet
- Kelembet A., church activist
