= Hrebinka urban hromada =

Hrebinka urban hromada Гребінківська міська громада
- Hromada
- Interactive map of Hrebinka urban hromada
- Country: Ukraine
- Oblast: Poltava Oblast
- Raion: Lubny Raion
- Admin. center: Hrebinka

Area
  - Total: 595.7 km^{2} (230.0 sq mi)

Population (2026)
  - Total: 22,425
  - Density: 37.64/km^{2} (97.50/sq mi)
- CATOTTG code: UA53040010000091190
- Settlements: 42
- Cities: 1
- Villages: 41
- Website: www.hrebinka.org.ua

Hrebinka urban territorial hromada (Ukrainian: Гребінківська міська територіальна громада, romanized: Hrebinkivska miska terytorialna hromada) is one of the hromadas of Ukraine, located in Lubny Raion, Poltava Oblast. Its administrative centre is the city of Hrebinka.

The hromada has a total area of 595.7 km^{2} (230.0 mi^{2}), and a population of 12,511 (as of 2018).

== History ==
The community was formed on March 31, 2017, through the merger of the Hrebinka City Council, the Marianivka Village Council, and the Sloboda-Petrivka Village Council of the Hrebinka Raion.

On June 12, 2020, by an order of the Cabinet of Ministers of Ukraine, the Nataliivka Village Council was incorporated into the community. The community itself was established encompassing the territories of the former Grebinka City Council and the following village councils: Marianivka, Sloboda-Petrivka, Berezivka, Hryhorivka, Korovaivka, Kulazhyntsi, Maiorshchyna, Nataliivka, Ovsiuky, Oleksandrivka, Pochaiivka, Rudkivka, Serbynivka, Stukalivka, Tarasivka, and Topolivka. On July 19, 2020, it became part of the enlarged Lubny Raion.

== Composition ==
The community comprises the city of Hrebinka and 41 villages:

- Berezivka
- Besidivshchyna
- Horby
- Hrushkivka
- Hryhorivka
- Hulakivka
- Kalynivka
- Korniivka
- Korovai
- Kulazhyntsi
- Lutaika
- Maiorshchyna
- Marianivka
- Mykhailivka
- Natalivka
- Novodar
- Novoselivka
- Oleksandrivka
- Orzhytsia
- Osavulshchyna
- Ovsiuky
- Pavlivshchyna
- Pochaivka
- Pokrovshchyna
- Poliove
- Pysarshchyna
- Rudka
- Saivka
- Serbynivka
- Simaky
- Skochak
- Sliporid-Ivanivka
- Slobodo-Petrivka
- Sotnytske
- Stukalivka
- Svitanok
- Tarasivka
- Topoleve
- Vidradne
- Vysoke
- Zahrebellia

== Starosta okruhs ==
- Berezivka (Berezivka, Korniivka);
- Korovai (Korovai, Lutaika);
- Kulazhyntsi-Natalivka (Kalynivka, Kulazhyntsi, Natalivka);
- Marianivka (Marianivka, Novodar);
- Maiorshchyna (Maiorshchyna, Sliporid-Ivanivka);
- Ovsiuky (Ovsiuky, Pokrovshchyna);
- Oleksandrivka (Oleksandrivka, Osavulshchyna, Pavlivshchyna, Simaky, Vysoke);
- Pochaivka (Besidivshchyna, Novoselivka, Pochaivka, Skochak, Sotnytske);
- Rudka (Horby, Rudka);
- Serbynivka (Hrushkivka, Saivka, Serbynivka);
- Slobodo-Petrivka (Hulakivka, Orzhytsia, Poliove, Slobodo-Petrivka, Zahrebellia)
- Stukalivka-Hryhorivka (Hryhorivka, Mykhailivka, Pysarshchyna, Stukalivka)
- Tarasivka (Tarasivka)
- Topoleve (Svitanok, Topoleve, Vidradne)
