= Orzhytsia Raion =

Former subdivision of Poltava Oblast, Ukraine

Orzhytsia Raion Оржицький район
- Raion
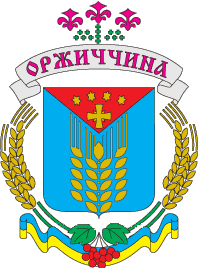
- Flag Coat of arms

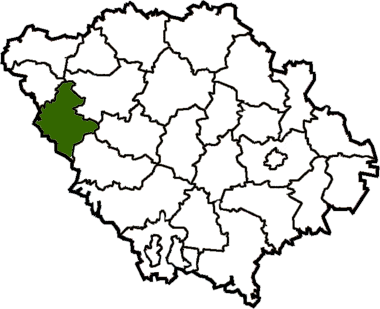
- Coordinates: 49°52′54.5556″N 32°39′6.8436″E
- Country: Ukraine
- Oblast: Poltava Oblast
- Established: 7 March 1923
- Disestablished: 18 July 2020
- Admin. center: Orzhytsia
- Subdivisions: List: — city councils; — settlement councils; — rural councils; Number of localities: — cities; — urban-type settlements; 50 — villages; — rural settlements

Government
  - Governor: Grygoriy Rybachov

Area
  - Total: 1,000 km^{2} (390 sq mi)

Population (2020)
  - Total: 22,741
  - Density: 23/km^{2} (59/sq mi)
- Time zone: UTC+02:00 (EET)
  - Summer (DST): UTC+03:00 (EEST)
- Postal index: 37700—37752
- Area code: +380-5357
- Website: Official homepage

Orzhytsia Raion (Ukrainian: Оржицький район) was a raion (district) in Poltava Oblast of central Ukraine. The raion's administrative center was the urban-type settlement of Orzhytsia. The raion was abolished and its territory was merged into Lubny Raion on 18 July 2020 as part of the administrative reform of Ukraine, which reduced the number of raions of Poltava Oblast to four. The last estimate of the raion population was 22,741 (2020 est.)
