= Lokhvytsia Raion =

Former subdivision of Poltava Oblast, Ukraine

Lokhvytsia Raion Лохвицький район
- Raion
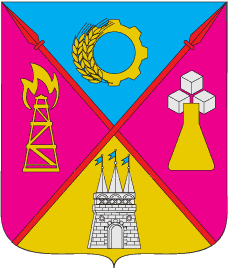
- Flag Coat of arms

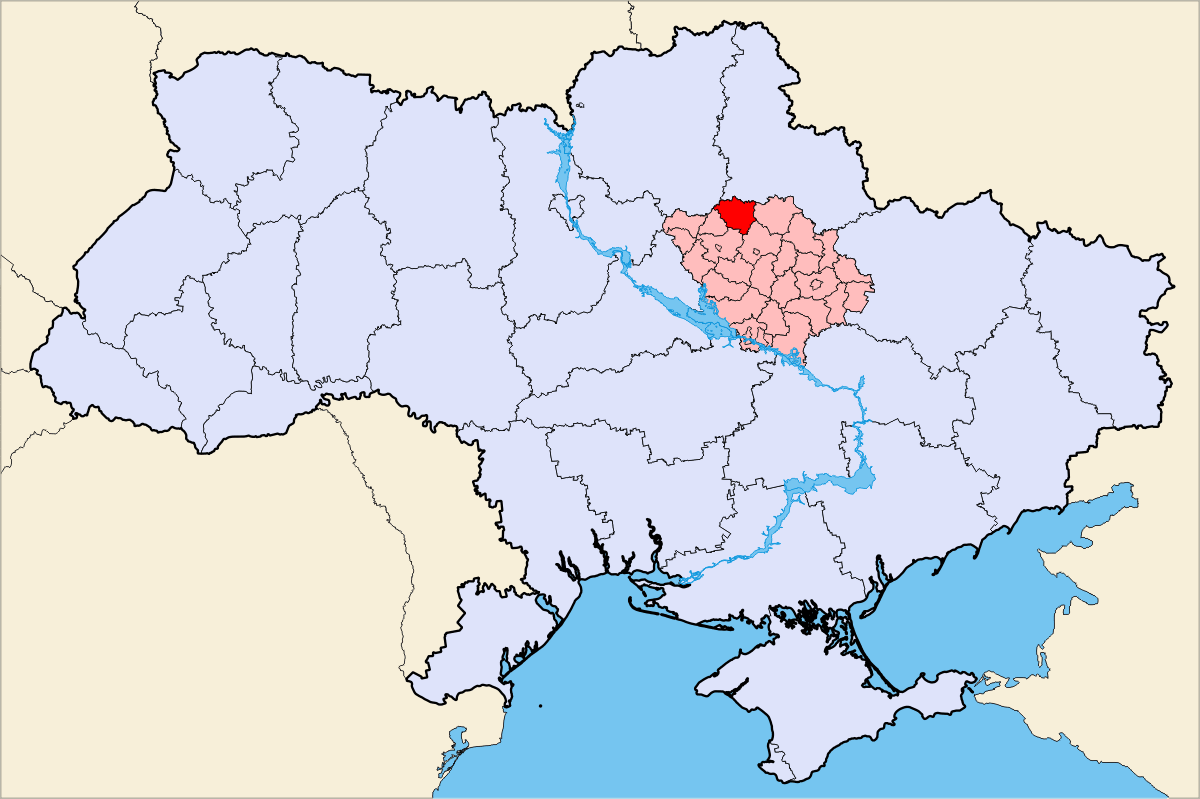
- Coordinates: 50°21′53.2146″N 33°19′1.6356″E
- Country: Ukraine
- Oblast: Poltava Oblast
- Established: 1971
- Disestablished: 18 July 2020
- Admin. center: Lokhvytsia
- Subdivisions: List: — city councils; — settlement councils; — rural councils; Number of localities: — cities; — urban-type settlements; 83 — villages; — rural settlements

Government
  - Governor: Viktor Stchurov

Area
  - Total: 1,300 km^{2} (500 sq mi)

Population (2020)
  - Total: 40,617
  - Density: 31/km^{2} (81/sq mi)
- Time zone: UTC+02:00 (EET)
  - Summer (DST): UTC+03:00 (EEST)
- Area code: +380
- Website: Official homepage

Lokhvytsia Raion (Ukrainian: Лохвицький район, romanized: Loxvyc'kyj rajon) was a raion (district) in Poltava Oblast in central Ukraine. The raion's administrative center was the city of Lokhvytsia. The raion was abolished and its territory was merged into Myrhorod Raion on 18 July 2020 as part of the administrative reform of Ukraine, which reduced the number of raions of Poltava Oblast to four. The last estimate of the raion population was 40,617 (2020 est.)

An important river within the Lokhvytskyi Raion was the Sula River. The raion was established on 1971.

At the time of disestablishment, the raion consisted of three hromadas:

- Lokhvytsia urban hromada with the administration in Lokhvytsia;
- Sencha rural hromada with the administration in the village of Sencha;
- Zavodske urban hromada with the administration in the city of Zavodske.
