= Zavodske, Poltava Oblast =

City in Poltava Oblast, Ukraine

Zavodske Заводське
- City
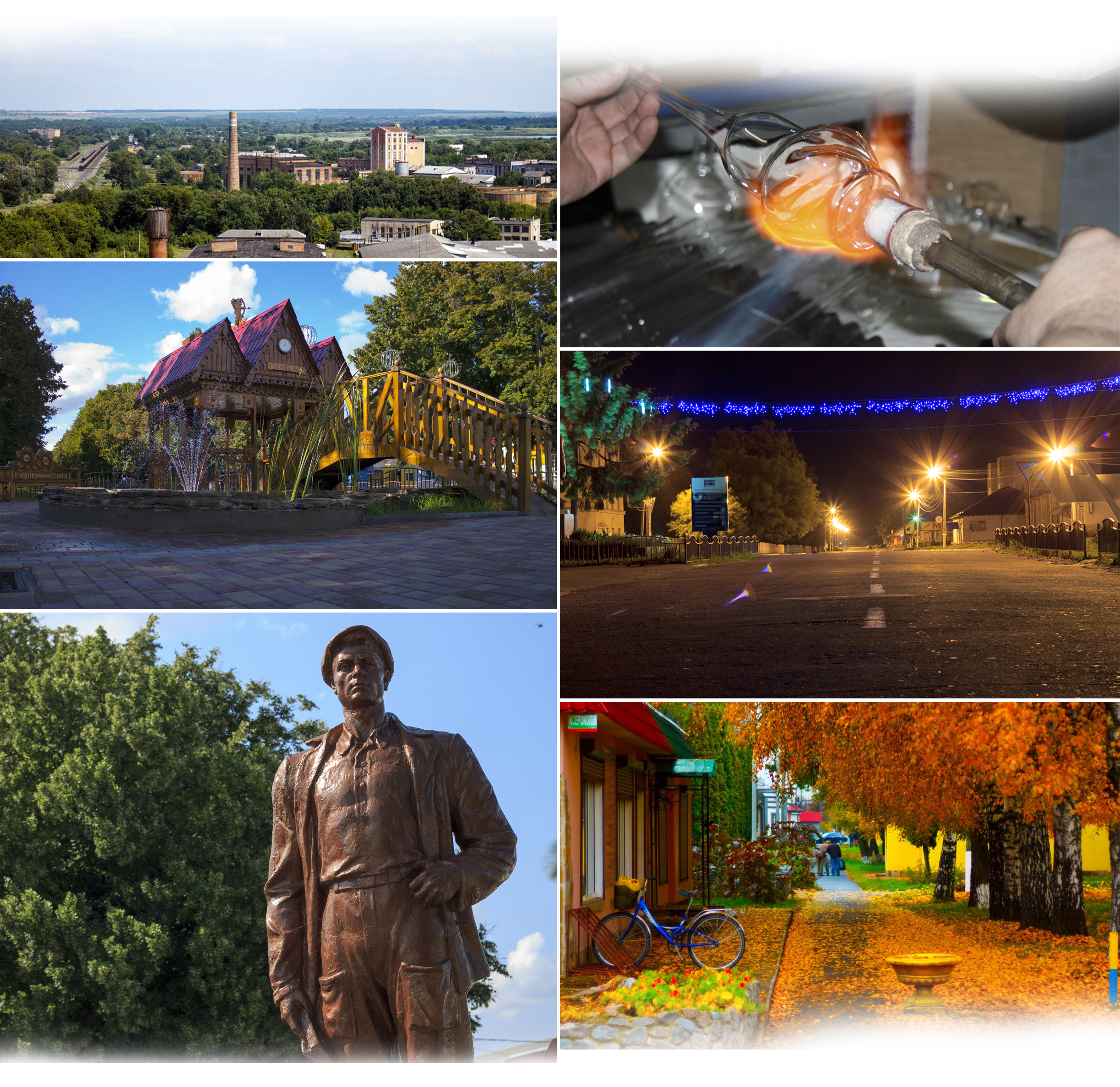

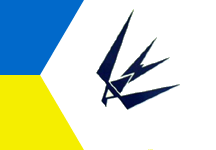
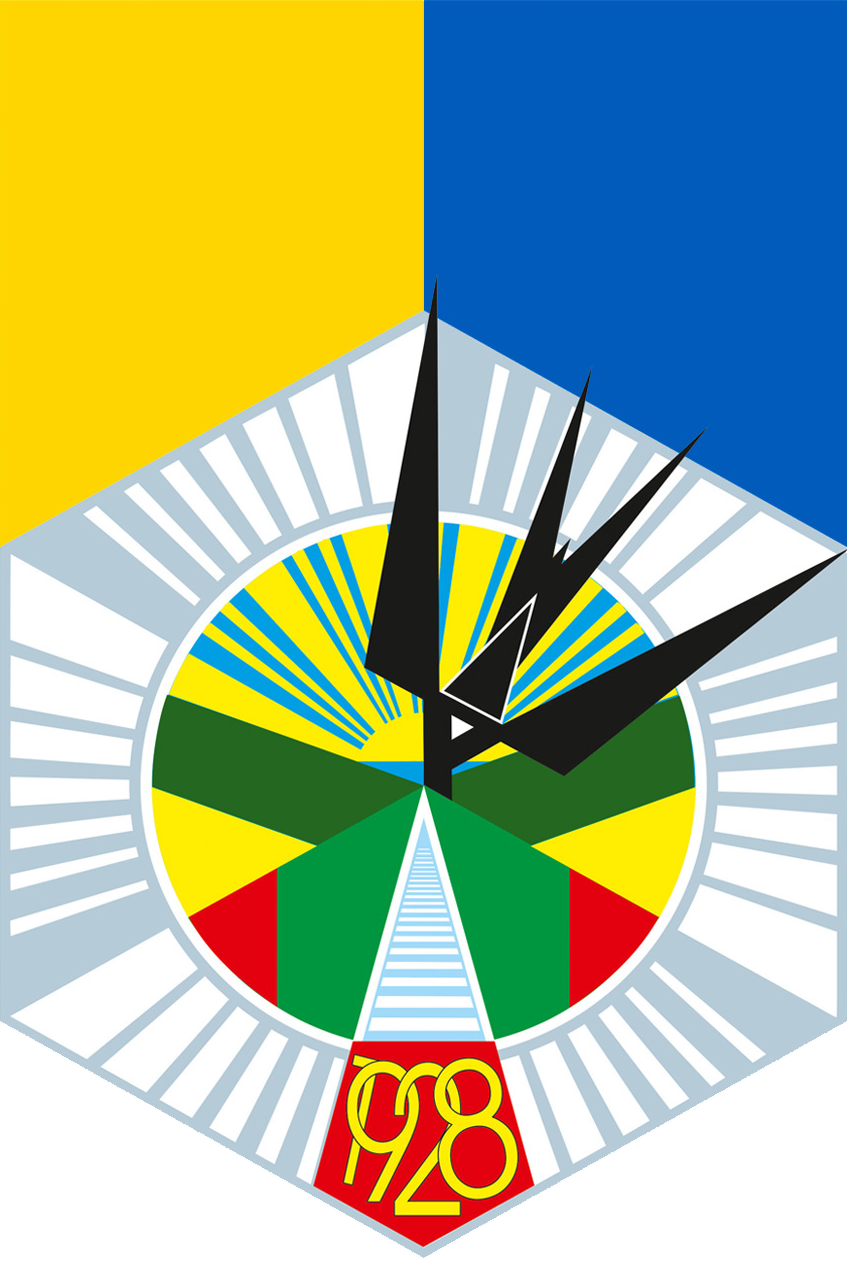
- Flag Coat of arms
- Interactive map of Zavodske
- Location within Poltava Oblast Location within Ukraine
- Coordinates: 50°23′N 33°23′E
- Country: Ukraine
- Oblast: Poltava Oblast
- Raion: Myrhorod Raion
- Hromada: Zavodske urban hromada
- Founded: 1928

Population (2022)
  - Total: 7,712
- Time zone: UTC+2 (EET)
  - Summer (DST): UTC+3 (EEST)
- Postal code: 37240
- Website: https://zv.gov.ua/en/

Zavodske (Ukrainian: Заводське, pronounced [zɐwodzʲˈsʲkɛ]) is a city in Myrhorod Raion, Poltava Oblast, Ukraine. It hosts the administration of Zavodske urban hromada, one of the hromadas of Ukraine. The city is located in the forest steppe zone of the Dnieper lowland in the north of the Poltava Oblast. Population: 7,712 (2022)

== History ==
Founded in 1928, until 1962 it was known as Stalinka before changing to Chervonozavodske (Ukrainian: Червонозаводське, Russian: Краснозаводское). In 1977, the village of Chervonozavodske was classified as a city of district subordination.

Following the 2015 law on decommunization the city was renamed early February 2016 to its current name Zavodske.

Until 18 July 2020, Zavodske belonged to Lokhvytsia Raion. The raion was abolished in July 2020 as part of the administrative reform of Ukraine, which reduced the number of raions of Poltava Oblast to four. The area of Lokhvytsia Raion was merged into Myrhorod Raion.

== Geography ==
The city is located on the terraces of the left bank of the Sula River in the forest steppe zone of the Dnieper lowland in the north of the Poltava region - 70 km from the district center of Myrhorod and 160 km from the city of Poltava.

Near the city there are broad-leaved forests and meadow vegetation of the river floodplain.

The climate of the Zavodske is temperate continental. The average temperature in January is −6.0 °C, in July it is +20.0 °C, the amount of precipitation is 480–580 mm/year, which falls mainly in the summer as rain.

Regional highway passes near the city. The Bakhmach-Kremenchuk railway line, belonging to the Southern Railway, passes through the city.

== Demographics ==
As of the 2001 Ukrainian census, Zavodske had a population of 9,026 people. The distribution of the population by ethnicity was as follows:

Ethnic groups in Zavodske
	percent
Ukrainians	96.01%
Russians	3.37%
Armenians	0.23%
Belarusians	0.20%
others	0.19%

== Objects of social sphere ==
1. Two secondary schools
2. Vocational school № 32
3. Lokhvitsky College of Mechanics and Technology of the Poltava State Agrarian Academy.
4. Two houses of culture.
5. Children's music school.
6. Children's studio "Soniachnyi Zaichyk"

== Gallery ==
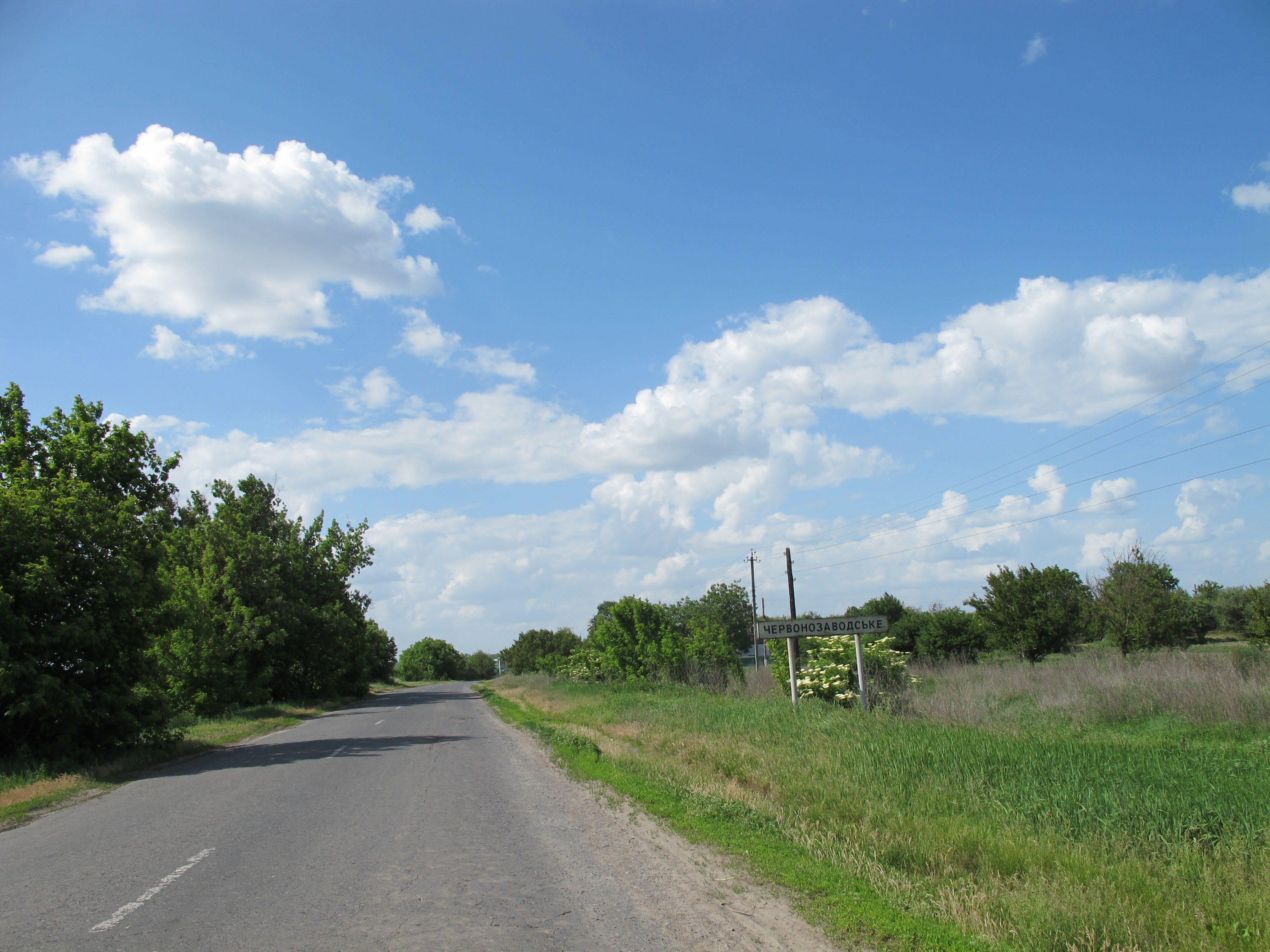
City sign

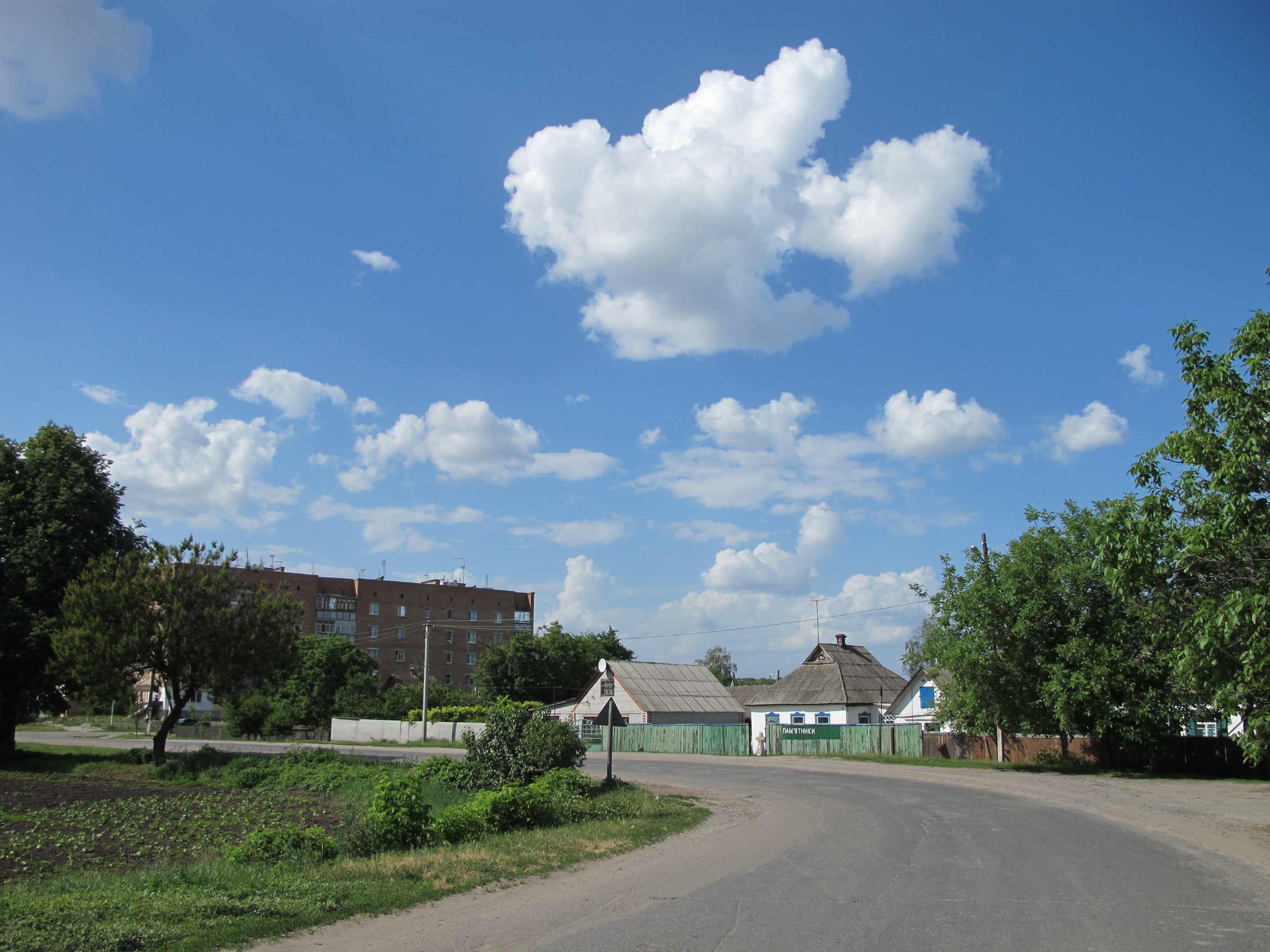
Residential buildings

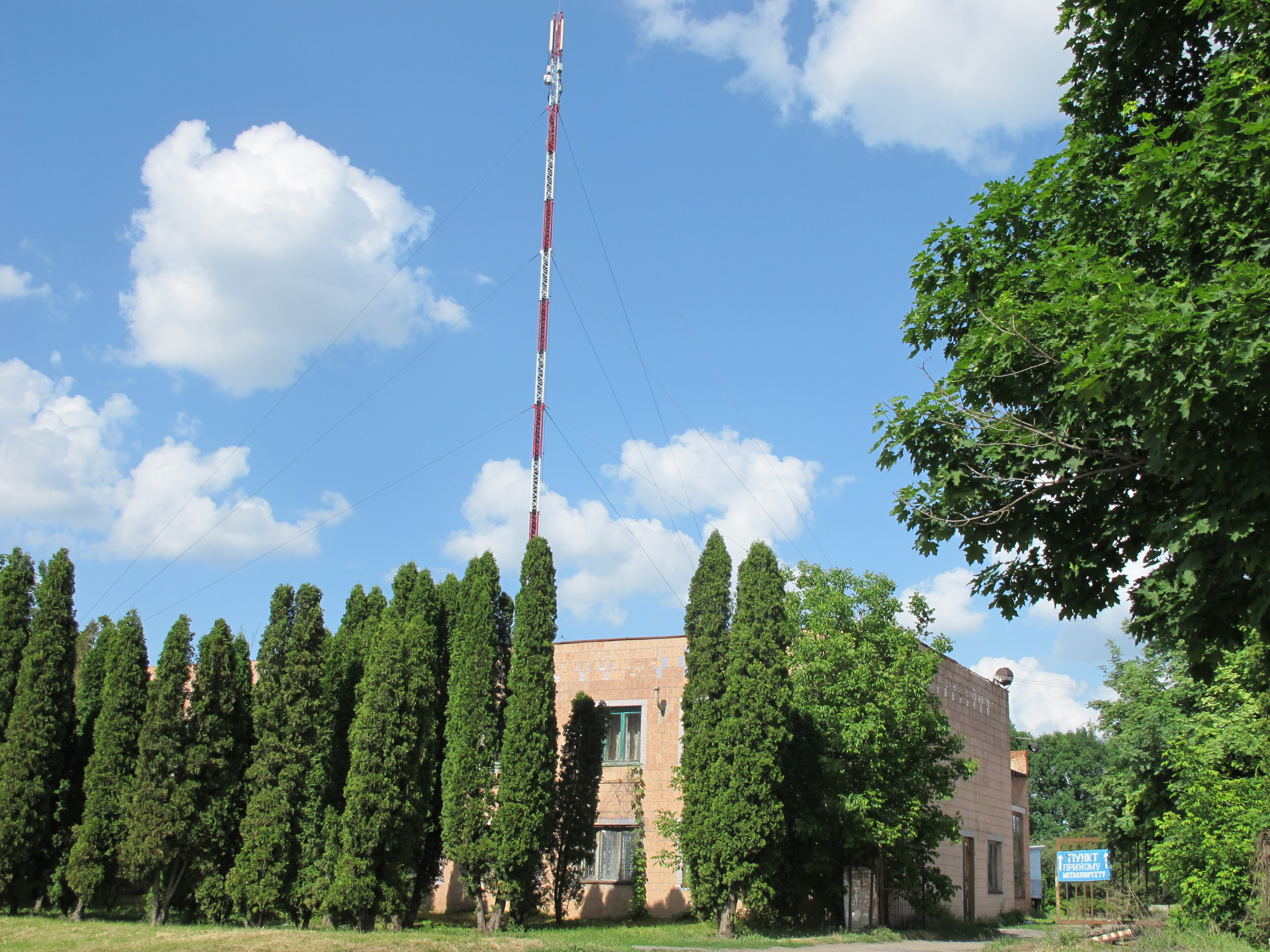
Radio mast

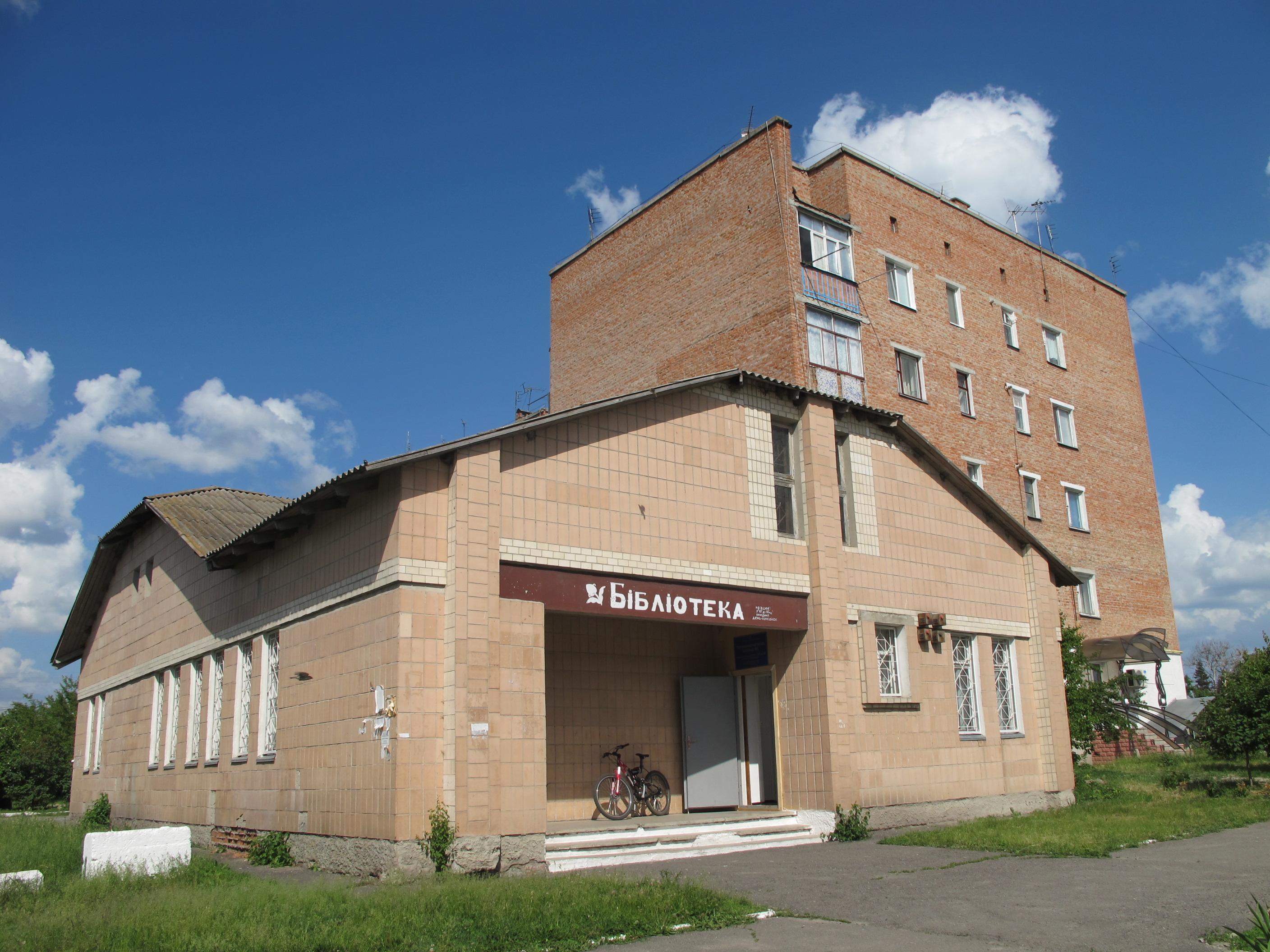
City library
