= Hrebinka =

City in Poltava Oblast, Ukraine

Hrebinka Гребінка
- City
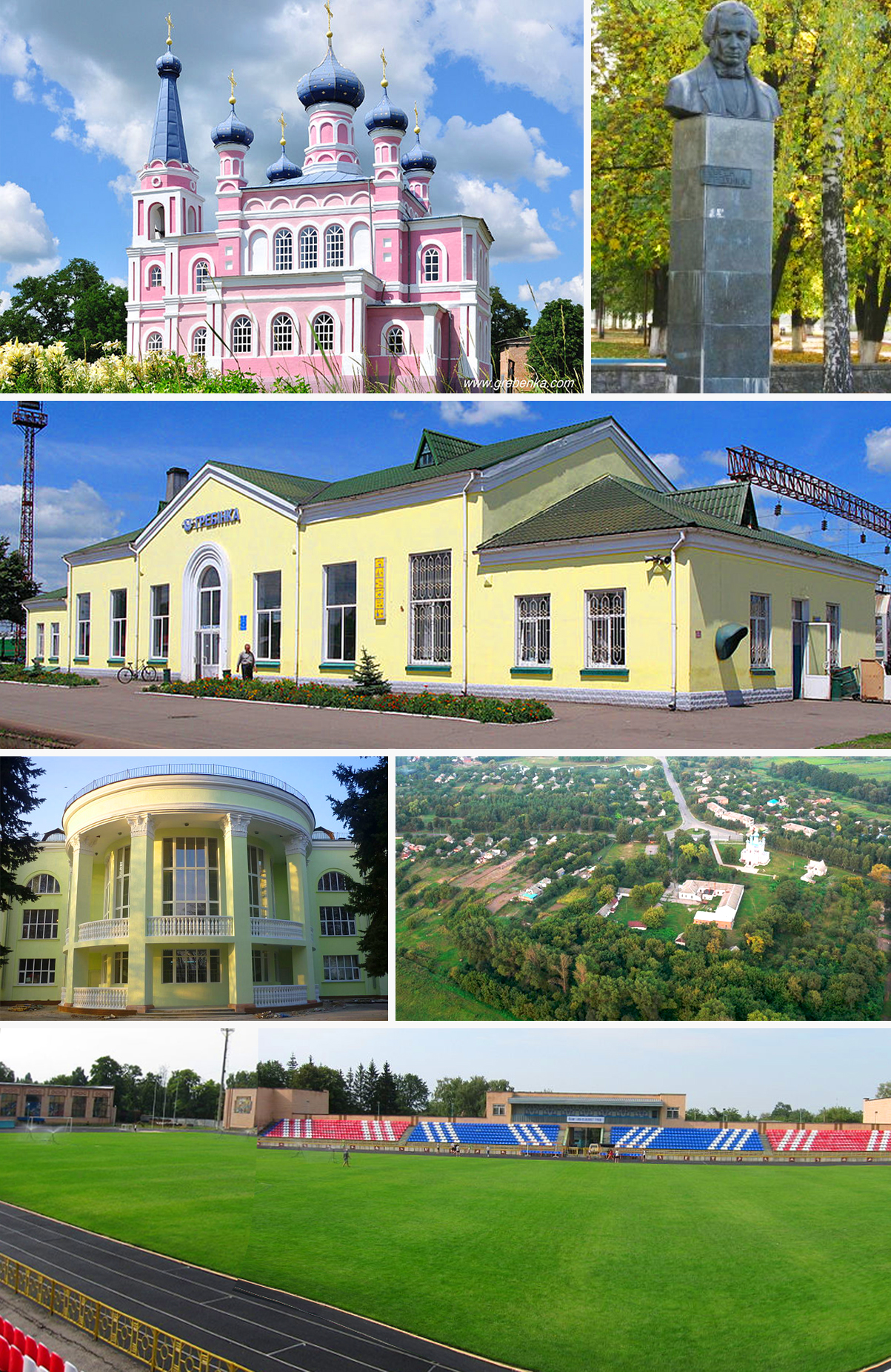
- Collage of Hrebinka

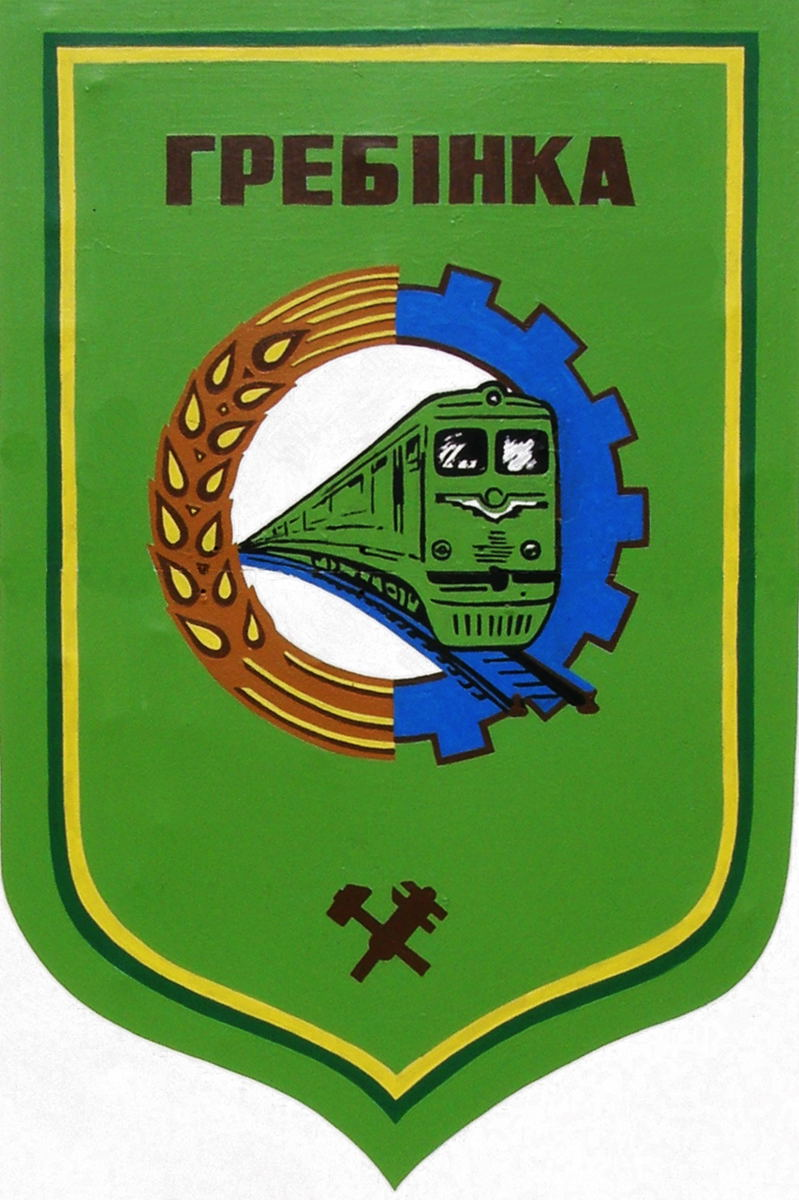
- Coat of arms
- Interactive map of Hrebinka
- Location within Poltava Oblast Location within Ukraine
- Coordinates: 50°7′N 32°25′E
- Country: Ukraine
- Oblast: Poltava Oblast
- Raion: Lubny Raion
- Hromada: Hrebinka urban hromada
- Founded: 1895

Population (2022)
  - Total: 10,541
- Area code: +380 5359

Hrebinka (Ukrainian: Гребінка, pronounced [ɦreˈbinkɐ]) is a city in Lubny Raion, Poltava Oblast, Ukraine. It hosts the administration of Hrebinka urban hromada, one of the hromadas of Ukraine. The city is located on the Orzhytsia river, a tributary of Sula in the Dnieper lowland, part of the forest steppe natural zone. Hrebinka is a railway junction on the way from Kyiv to Poltava. Population: 10,541 (2022 estimate).

== History ==
First, a new railway station was built near the village of Horodyshche, which was named Hrebinka in honor of the Ukrainian writer Yevhen Hrebinka, who was born nearby, in the village of Maryanivka.

During the Soviet-Ukrainian War, in January 1919 a unit of Sich Riflemen achieved a victory over Bolshevik troops in the area.

Until 18 July 2020, Hrebinka was the administrative center of Hrebinka Raion. The raion was abolished in July 2020 as part of the administrative reform of Ukraine, which reduced the number of raions of Poltava Oblast to four. The area of Hrebinka Raion was merged into Lubny Raion.

== Geography ==
Hrebinka is the center of the Hrebinka urban hromada is the northwest of the Lubny Raion. The distance from Hrebinka to the regional center is 190 kilometers, and to Kyiv - 156 km. The Hrebinka is located on the left bank of the Dnieper River. The city is located in the Dnieper lowland, in the forest steppe nature zone. There is a pine forest near the city.

The climate of the Hrebinka is temperate continental. The average temperature in January is −3.7 °C, in July it is +21.4 °C, the amount of precipitation is 480–580 mm/year, which falls mainly in the summer as rain.

Minerals of the Hrebinka territory: clay, sand.

The Kyiv-Kharkiv national highway (M-03) passes near Hrebinka. Interregional highways and a railway running in the Kyiv-Kharkiv direction pass through the city. Hrebinka is a railway junction on the border of three railways: Southern, Southwestern, and Odessa.

== Demographics ==
As of the 2001 Ukrainian census, Hrebinka had a population of 11,562 people. The distribution of the population by ethnicity and first language according to the census was as follows:

Ethnic groups in Hrebinka
	percent
Ukrainians	93.84%
Russians	5.12%
Belarusians	0.28%
Moldovans	0.10%
Armenians	0.10%
others	0.56%

Native languages in Hrebinka
	percent
Ukrainian	94.1%
Russian	5.3%
Belarusian	0.1%
Armenian	0.1%
Romanian	0.1%
others	0.3%

== Gallery ==
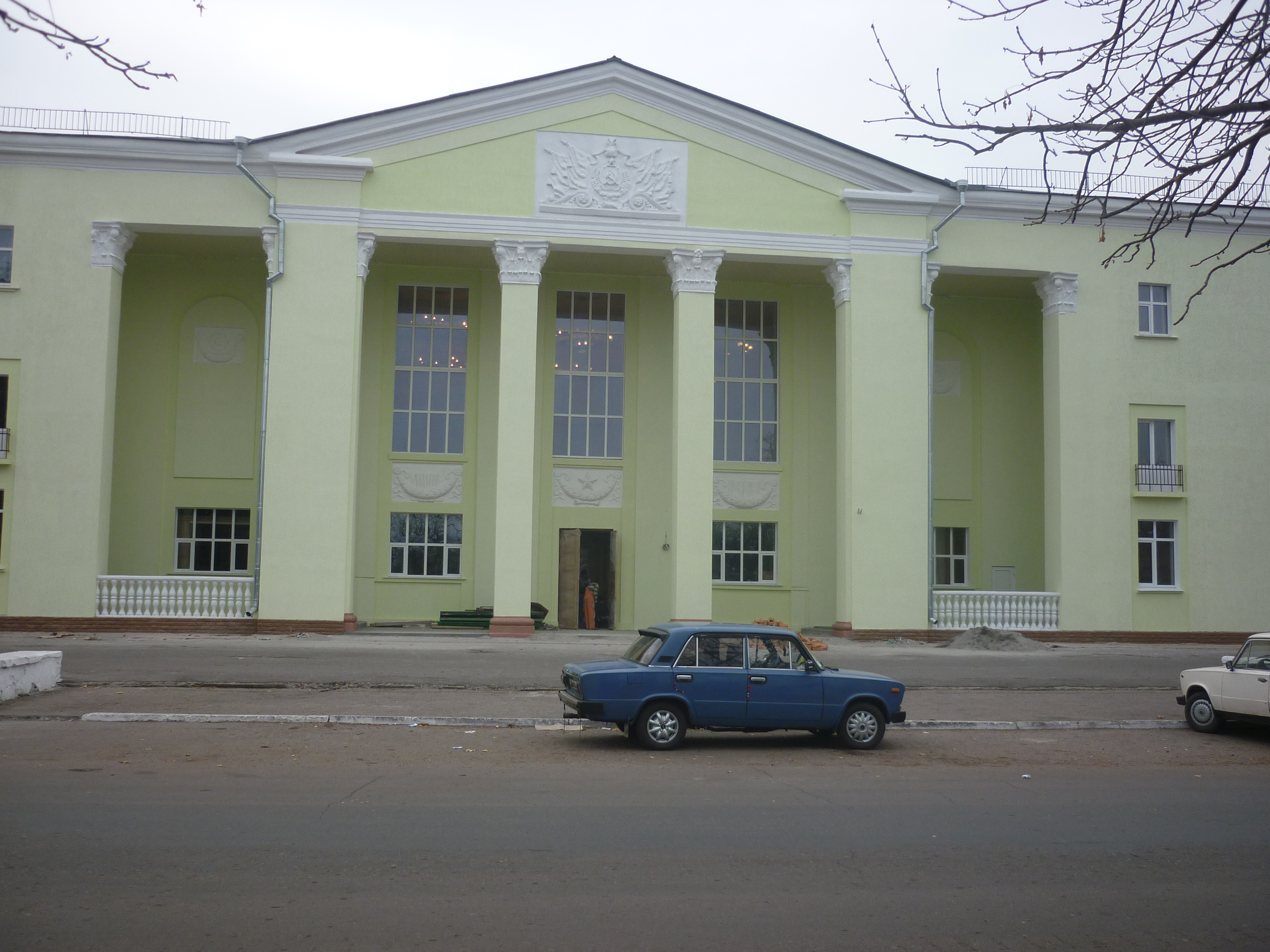
Palace of Culture

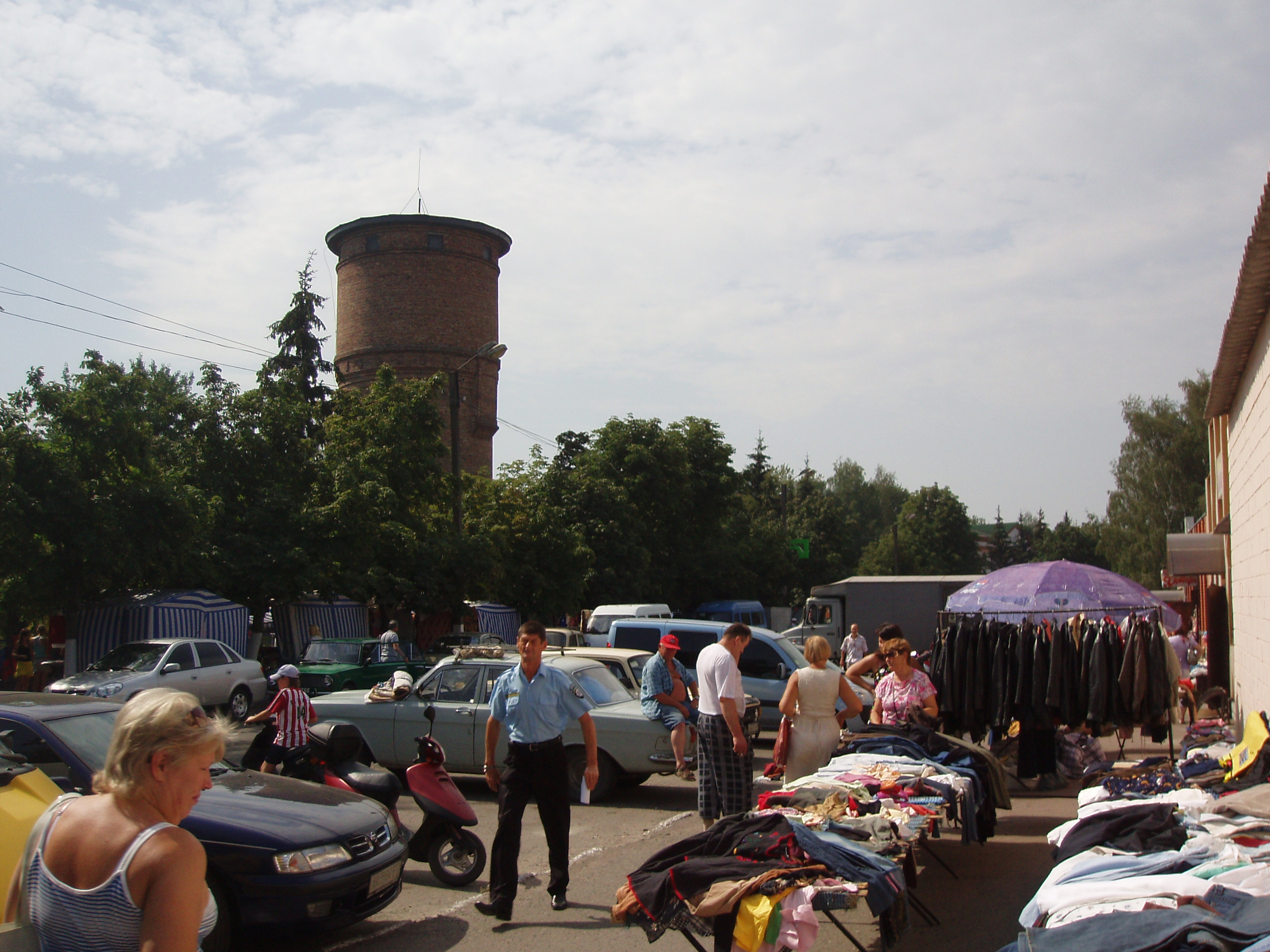
A Sunday market in Hrebinka

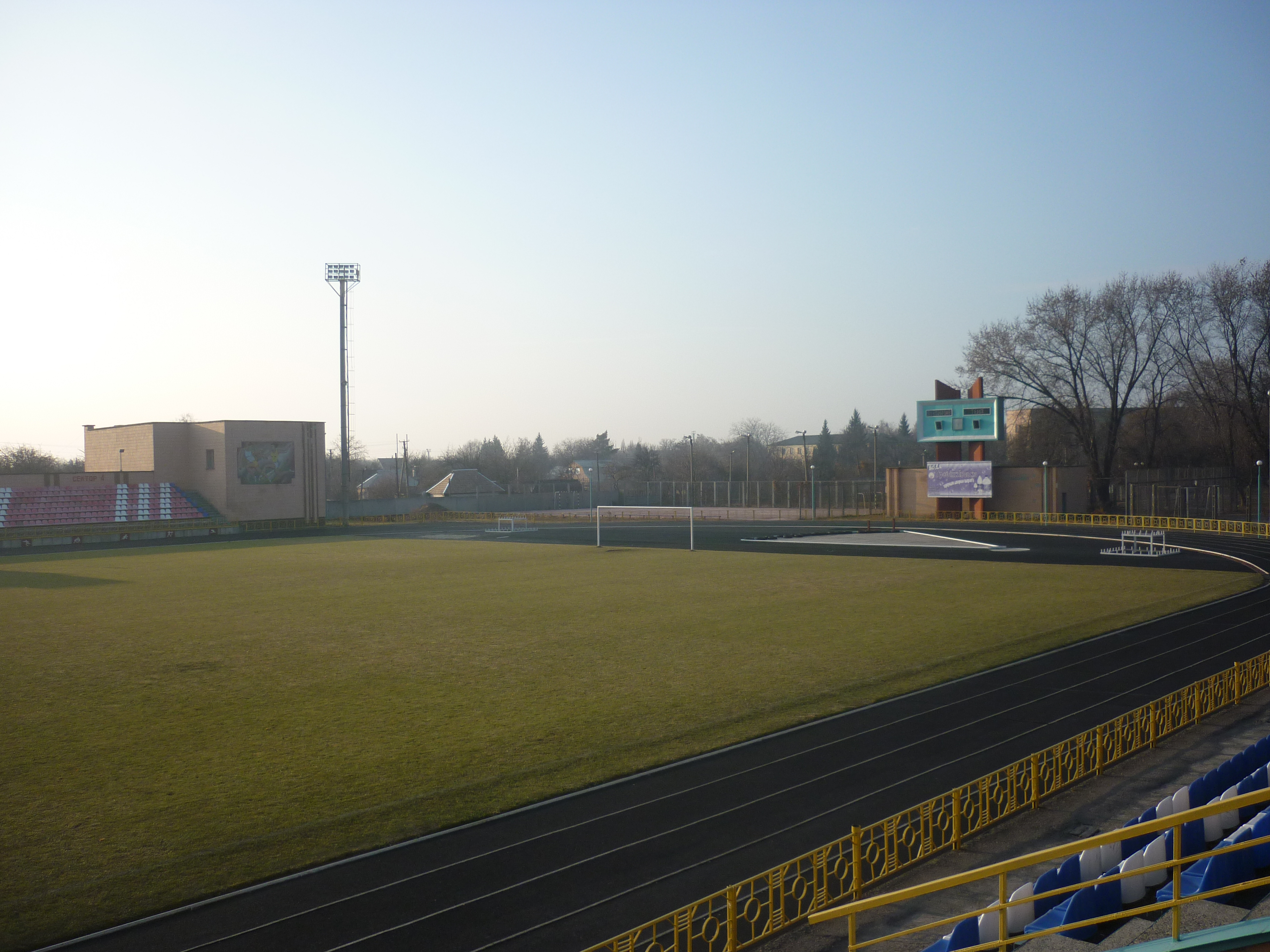
City stadium

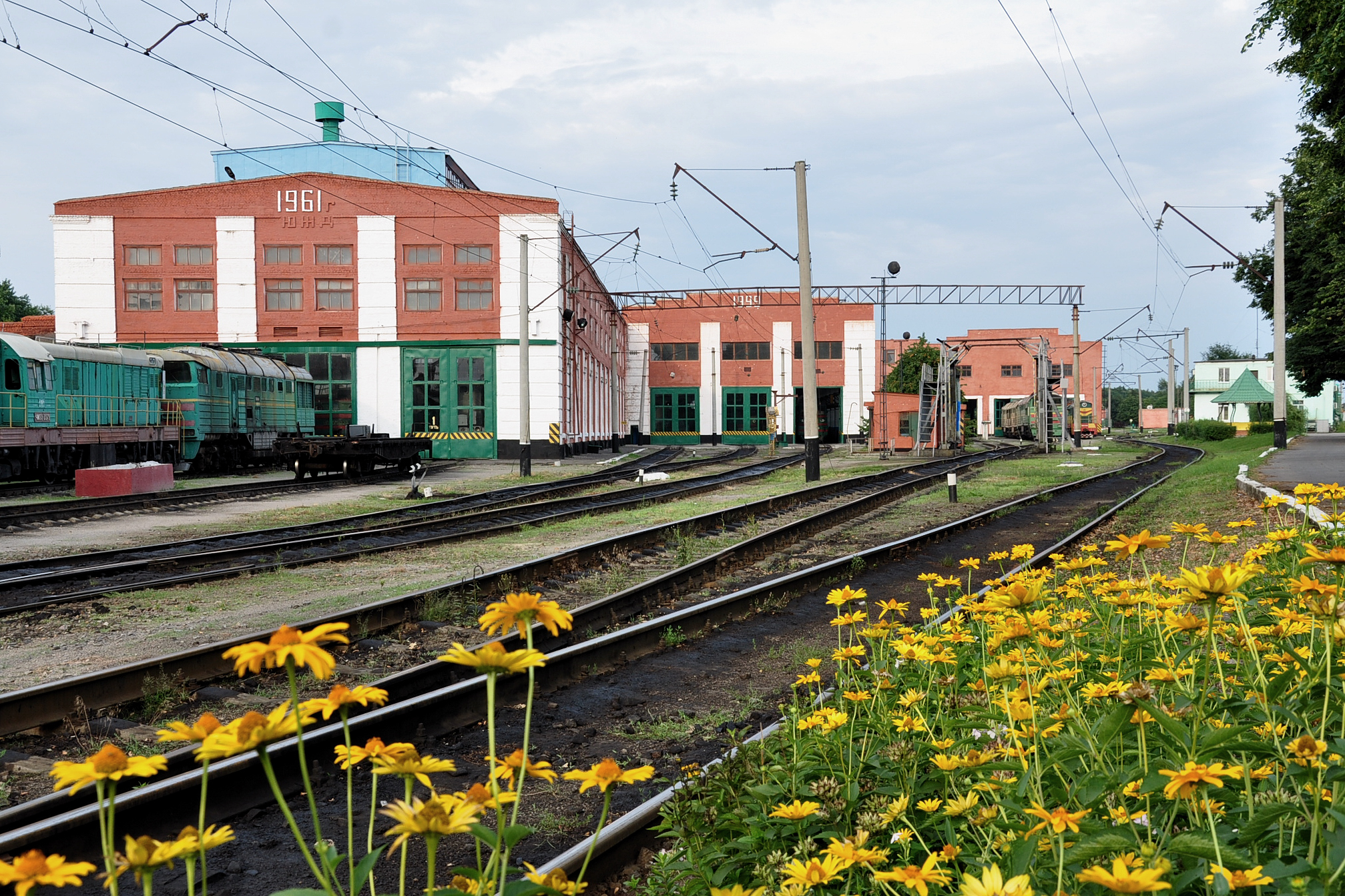
Hrebinka train depot

== Notable people ==
- Yevhen Hrebinka, (1812-1848), Ukrainian poet born in the area, the city was named after him
- Petro Vesklyarov (1911-1994), Ukrainian actor
