= Lokhvytsia =

City in Poltava Oblast, Ukraine

Lokhvytsia Лохвиця
- City
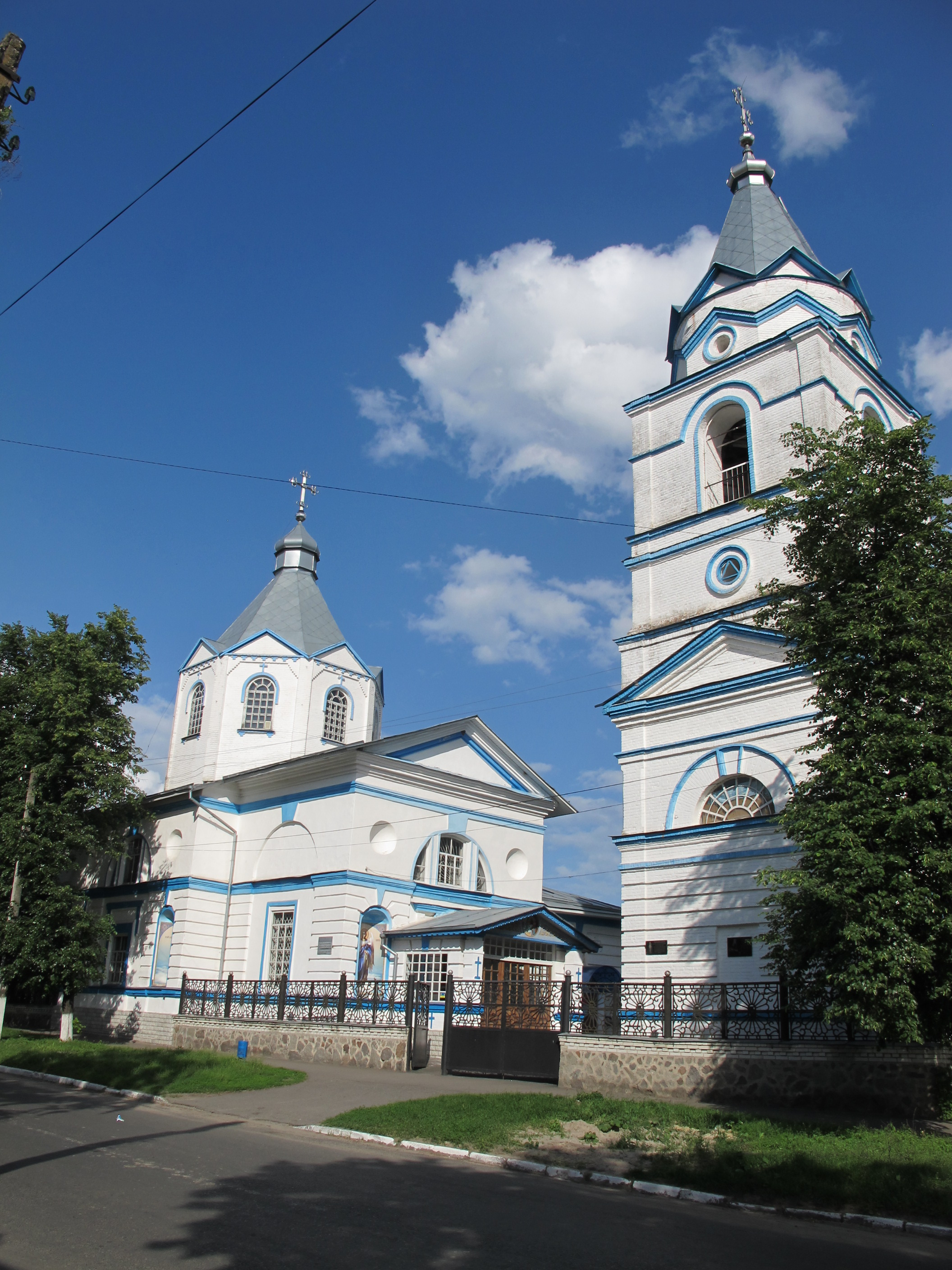
- Church of the Annunciation

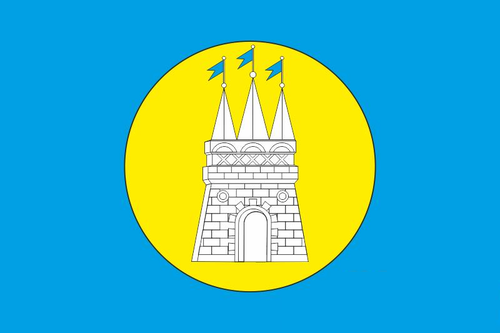
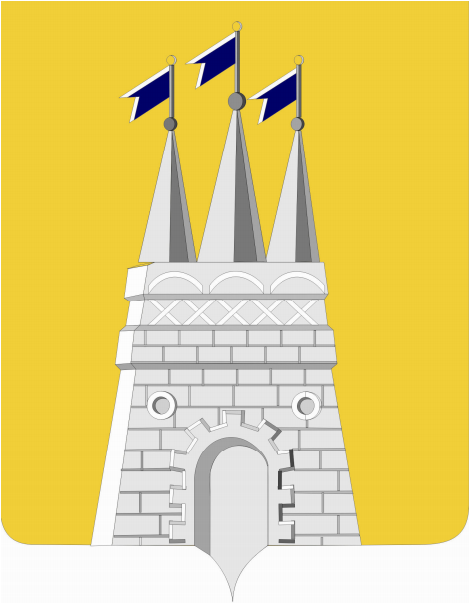
- Flag Seal
- Interactive map of Lokhvytsia
- Location within Ukraine Location within Poltava Oblast
- Coordinates: 50°21.58524′N 33°16.33596′E
- Country: Ukraine
- Oblast: Poltava Oblast
- Raion: Myrhorod Raion
- Hromada: Lokhvytsia urban hromada
- First mentioned: 1320

Area
  - Total: 14.92 km^{2} (5.76 sq mi)
- Elevation: 105 m (344 ft)

Population (2022)
  - Total: 11,014

Lokhvytsia (Ukrainian: Лохвиця, pronounced [ˈlɔxwɪtsʲɐ]) is a city in Myrhorod Raion, Poltava Oblast, central Ukraine. It is located on the banks of the Lokhvytsia River. Lokhvytsia hosts the administration of Lokhvytsia urban hromada, one of the hromadas of Ukraine. Population: 11,014 (2022 estimate).

== Name ==
In addition to the Ukrainian Лохвиця (Lokhvytsia), in other languages the name of the city is Russian: Ло́хвица, romanized: Lokhvitsa and Yiddish: לאחװיצא.

== History ==
The name of the river Lokhvytsia, as well as the town, comes from the Old Slavonic word lokhve which means "salmon".

At the time of Kievan Rus' the territory where the town is located was part of Principality of Pereyaslavl. The precise date of the foundation is unknown. From written records, it can be determined that Lokhvytsia existed prior to 1320.

In 1644, Magdeburg rights were granted to the town so that all town issues were to be resolved by a city council, elected by the wealthy citizens. In 1648–1658, Lokhvytsia was a Sotnia town of the Myrhorod Cossack Regiment, later (1658-1781) of the Lubny Cossack Regiment.

During World War II, Lokhvytsia was occupied by the German Army from September 12, 1941 to September 12, 1943. This was the town where the pincers of 1st Panzer Army (Kleist) and 2nd Panzer Army (Guderian) linked up, encircling more than 600,000 Soviet troops east of Kyiv.

The Hlynsko-Rozbyshiv (Myrhorod district) oil and gas deposits provide large volumes of oil and gas sufficient for the entire Poltava Oblast and beyond. Poltava oil is of high-quality: it contains up to 55 per cent of light oil and is quite low in sulphur. The natural gas consists of almost 70% of propane-butane fractions, which make it a valuable raw material for the chemical industry, such as the production of synthetic fibres and plastics.

Until 18 July 2020, Lokhvytsia was the administrative center of Lokhvytsia Raion. The raion was abolished in July 2020 as part of the administrative reform of Ukraine, which reduced the number of raions of Poltava Oblast to four. The area of Lokhvytsia Raion was merged into Myrhorod Raion.

== Population ==
=== Ethnic groups ===
Distribution of the population by ethnicity according to the 2001 census:

Ethnic groups in Lokhvytsia
	percent
Ukrainians	95.74%
Russians	3.59%
Belarusians	0.22%
Armenians	0.15%
Jews	0.10%
others	0.20%

=== Language ===
Distribution of the population by native language according to the 2001 census:

Language	Percentage
Ukrainian	96.65%
Russian	3.09%
other/undecided	0.26%

== Gallery ==
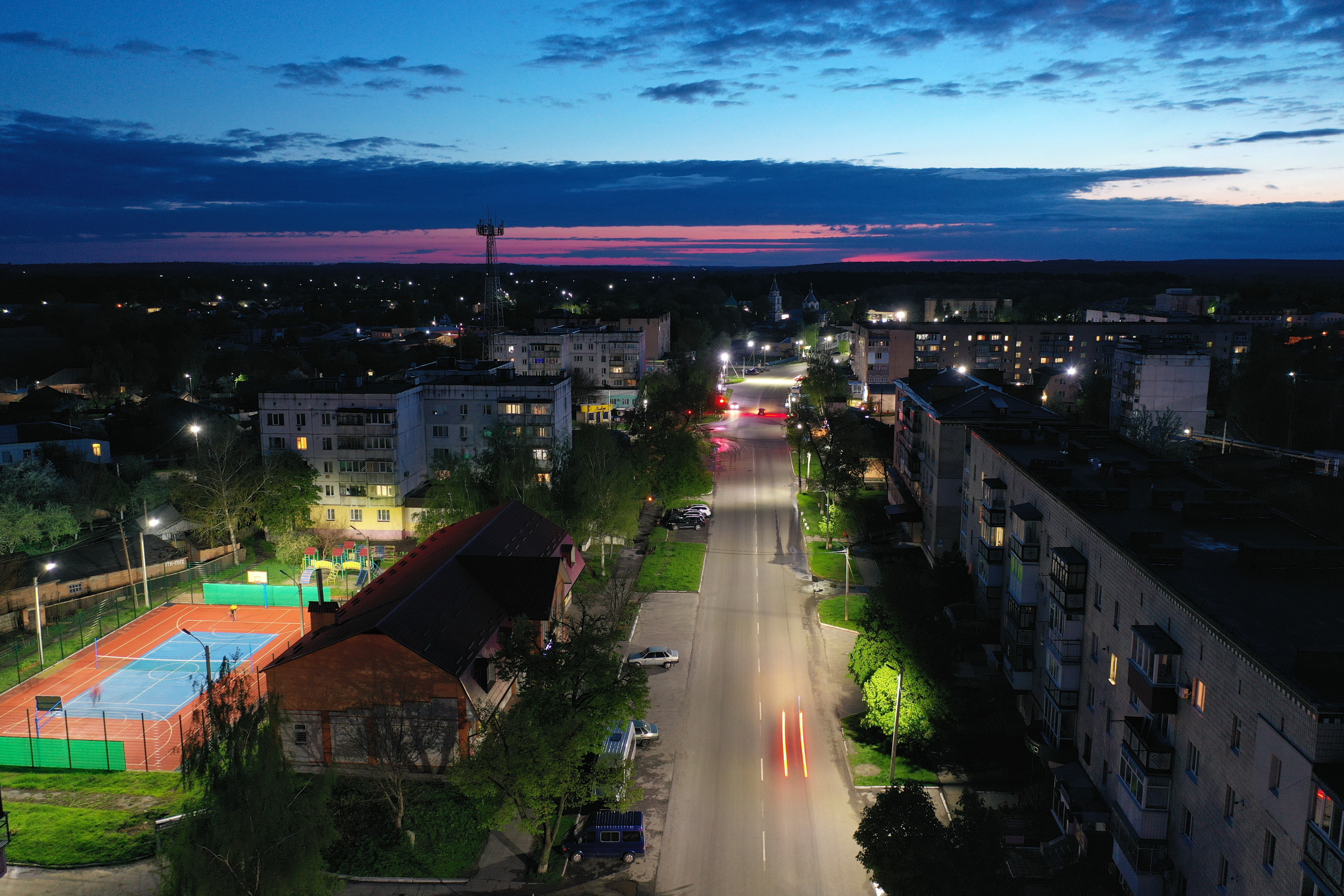
Cityscape in the evening (2021)

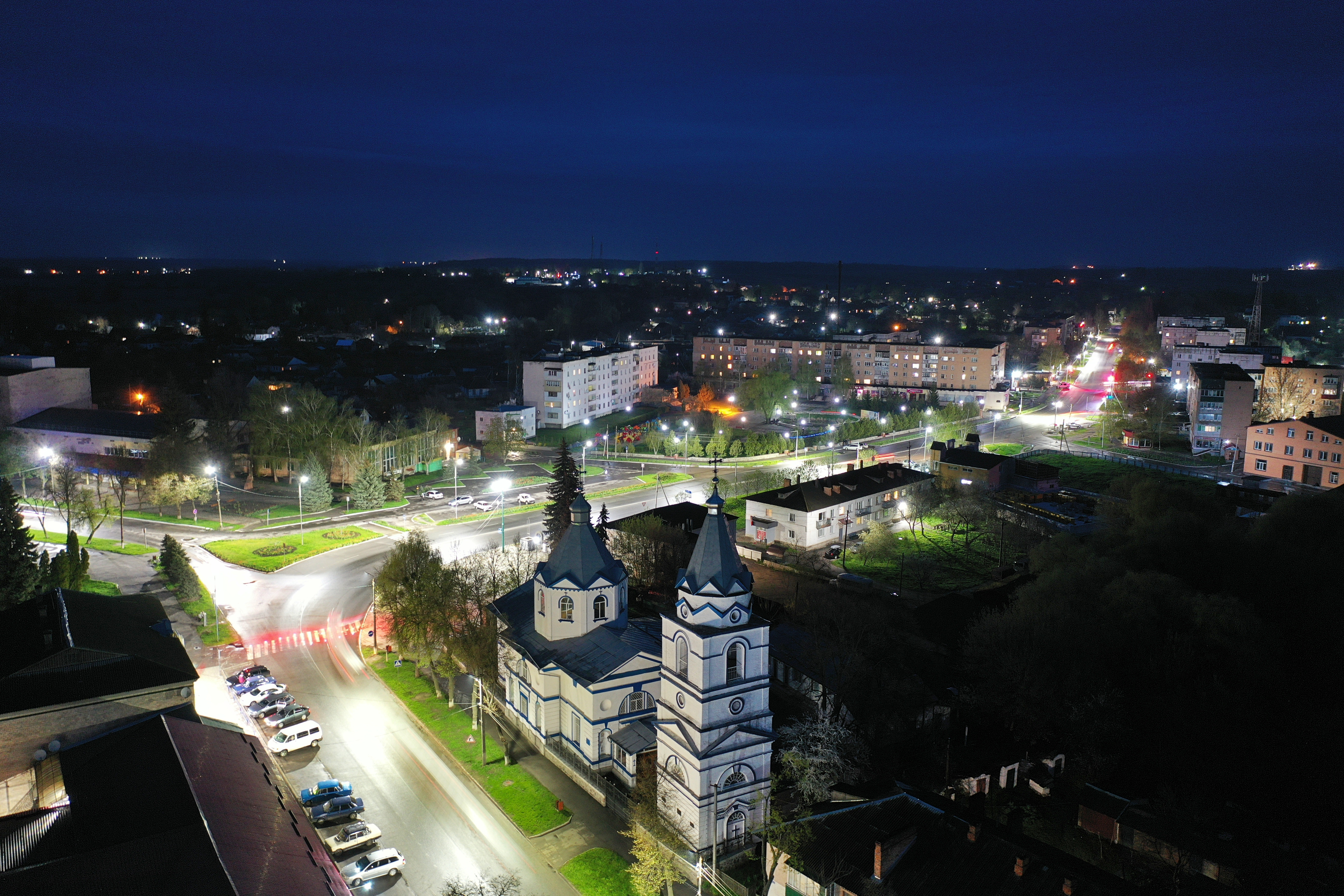
The central square (2021)

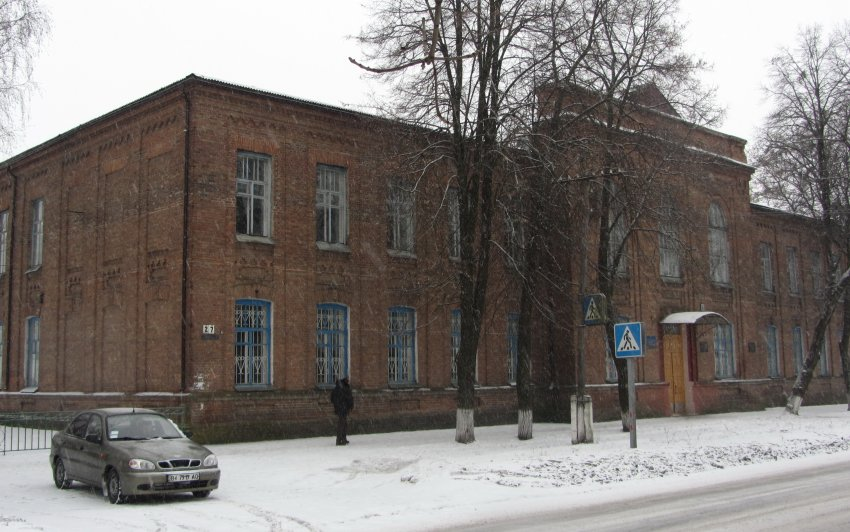
Lokhvytsia Medical School

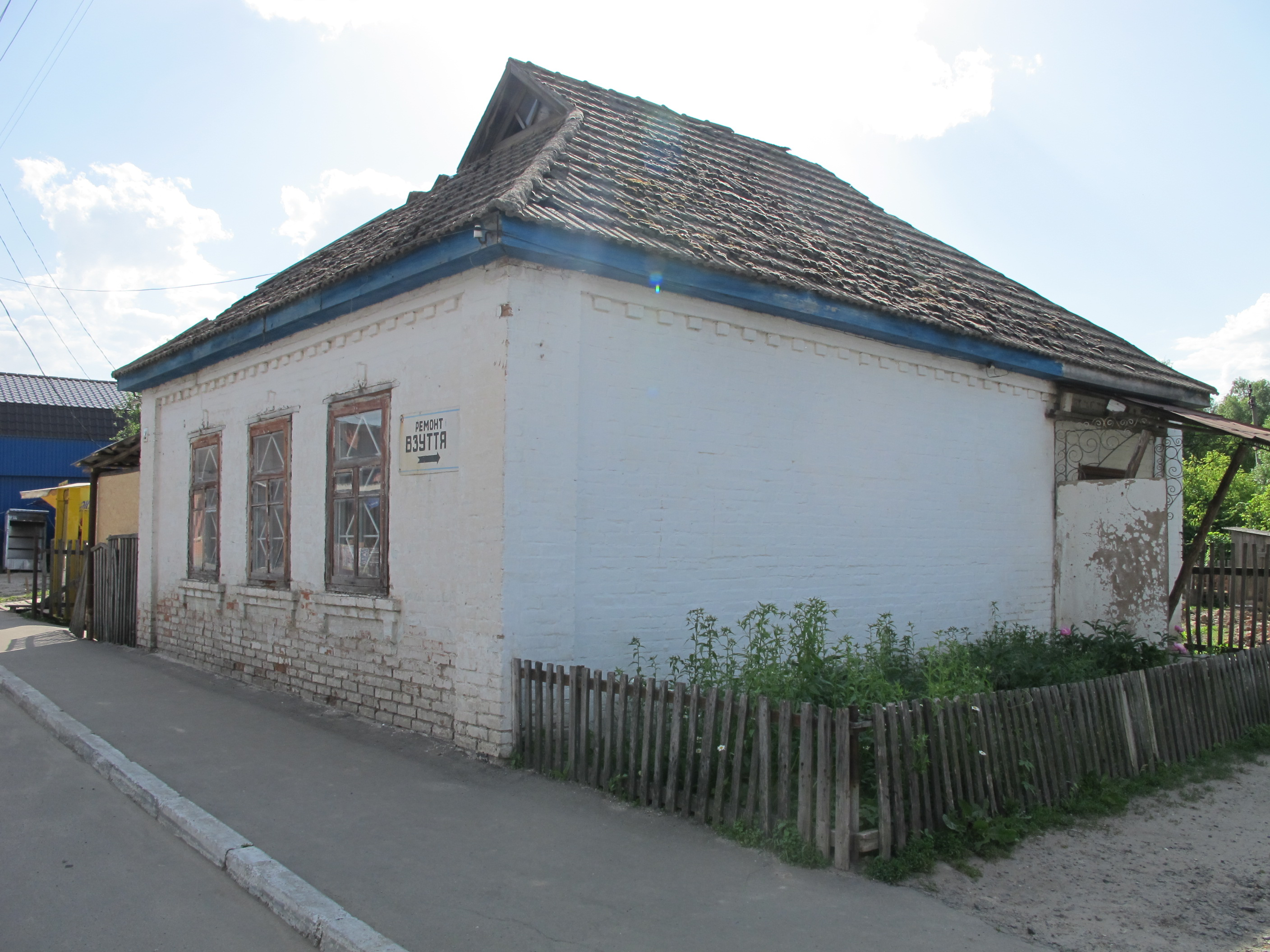
Old house

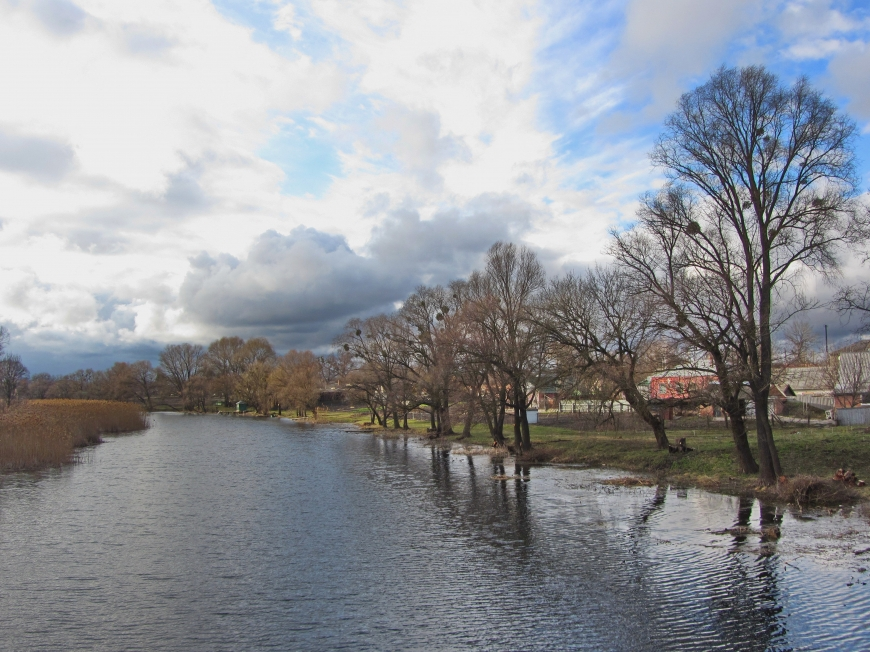
Lokhvytsia River

== Notable people ==
- Arkhyp Teslenko, Ukrainian writer
- Isaak Dunayevsky, Soviet composer
