= Lubny Raion =

Subdivision of Poltava Oblast, Ukraine

Lubny Raion Лубенський район
- Raion
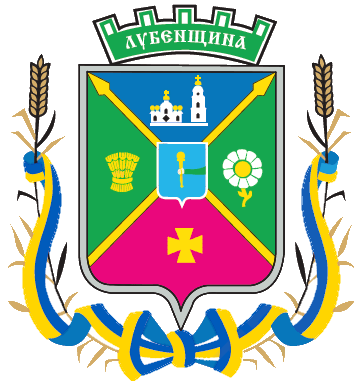
- Flag Coat of arms

- Coordinates: 50°2′41.1072″N 33°2′49.8408″E
- Country: Ukraine
- Oblast: Poltava Oblast
- Established: March 7, 1923
- Admin. center: Lubny
- Subdivisions: 7 hromadas

Government
  - Governor: Oleksiy Dyadechko

Area
  - Total: 5,472.7 km^{2} (2,113.0 sq mi)

Population (2022)
  - Total: 184,616
  - Density: 33.734/km^{2} (87.371/sq mi)
- Time zone: UTC+02:00 (EET)
  - Summer (DST): UTC+03:00 (EEST)
- Postal index: 37510—37574
- Area code: +380-5361
- Website: Official homepage

Lubny Raion (Ukrainian: Лубенський район) is a raion (district) in Poltava Oblast in central Ukraine. The raion's administrative center is the city of Lubny. Population: 184,616 (2022 estimate).

On 18 July 2020, as part of the administrative reform of Ukraine, the number of raions of Poltava Oblast was reduced to four, and the area of Lubny Raion was significantly expanded. The January 2020 estimate of the raion population was 30,260 (2020 est.).

== Administrative division ==
=== Current ===
After the reform in July 2020, the raion consisted of 7 hromadas:

- Chornukhy settlement hromada with the administration in the rural settlement of Chornukhy, transferred from Chornukhy Raion;
- Hrebinka urban hromada with the administration in the city of Hrebinka, transferred from Hrebinka Raion;
- Khorol urban hromada with the administration in the city of Khorol, transferred from Khorol Raion;
- Lubny urban hromada with the administration in the city of Lubny, transferred from Lubny Raion and the city of Lubny;

=== Before 2020 ===
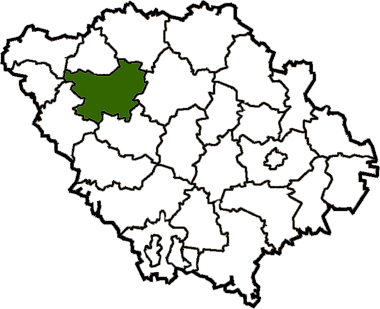
Lubny Raion in Poltava Oblast before 2020

Before the 2020 reform, the raion consisted of one hromada, Lubny urban hromada with the administration in Lubny. After the reform, the city of Lubny was merged into Lubny urban hromada, and part of the hromada was transferred into Myrhorod Raion.

== Geography ==
Lubny Raion is located in the northwest part of Poltava Oblast, on the Dnieper Lowland, on the left bank of the Dnieper Valley. The relief of the district is an undulating plain, cut by river valleys, ravines, and gullies.

The climate of the Lubny Raion is temperate continental. The average temperature in January is −3.7 °C, in July it is +21.4 °C, the amount of precipitation is 480–580 mm/year, which falls mainly in the summer as rain.

The landscapes are represented by forest-steppe. Chernozems dominate the territory of the Lubny Raion.

The Khorol and Sula rivers, left tributaries of the Dnieper, flow through the district. The river in the floodplain has many oxbow lakes and artificial lakes.

Lubny Raion has reserves of clay, brown coal, peat.

The Lower Sula National Nature Park are located in the Lubny Raion. The natural park is a nesting and resting place for many species of migratory birds, including: yellow heron, black-headed gull, sandpiper, magpie, stilt, and steppe warbler, which are listed in the Red Book of Ukraine.
