= Terny =

Terny (Ukrainian: Терни) may refer to the following places in Ukraine:

- Terny, Kramatorsk Raion, Donetsk Oblast, village in Kramatorsk Raion, Donetsk Oblast
- Terny, Lubny Raion, Poltava Oblast, village in Lubny Raion, Poltava Oblast
- Terny, Sumy Oblast, rural settlement in Romny Raion, Sumy Oblast
