= Lubny railway station =

Ukrainian railway station

Lubny Лубни
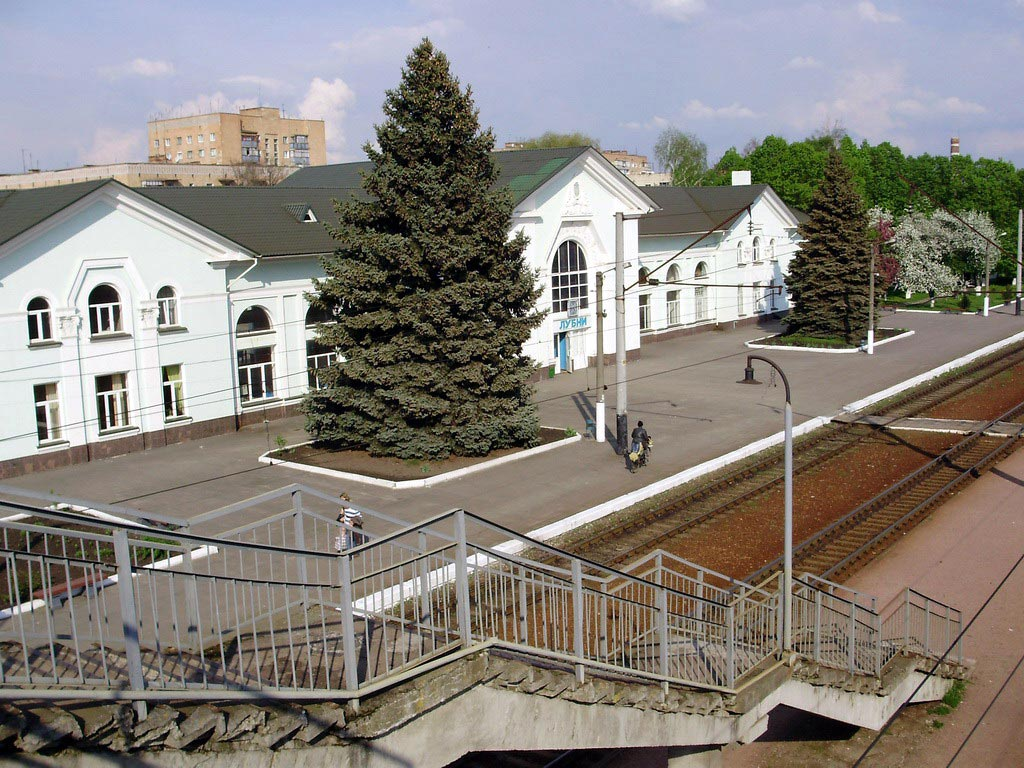

General information
- Location: Vokzalna Ploshcha 6, Lubny; Ukraine
- Coordinates: 50°01′13.9″N 32°58′31.5″E
- System: Southern Railway terminal
- Owner: Ukrzaliznytsia
- Platforms: 3
- Tracks: 7

Construction
- Parking: Yes

History
- Opened: 1901
Location

Lubny railway station (Ukrainian: Лубни) is a railway station in the Ukrainian city Lubny.

== See also ==
- Ukrzaliznytsia - the national railway company of Ukraine
