= Johannes Hähle =

German photographer (1906–1944)

- Born: 15 February 1906; Chemnitz
- Died: 10 June 1944 (aged 38); La Bijude, Normandy
- Military career
- Allegiance: Nazi Germany
- Units: Baubataillon 146 (from January 1940 to June 1941) Propagandakompanie 637 (to September 1942) Propagandakompanie 698 (to 10 June 1944)
- Conflicts: World War II: Battle of France; Invasion of Normandy

Johannes Hähle (15 February 1906 – 10 June 1944) was a German military photographer who served in the Wehrmacht Propaganda Troops during World War II.

== Life ==
Hähle made a training as merchant and photographer. In 1932 he joined the Nazi Party. In January 1940 he was drafted to the Wehrmacht and sent to the Battle of France with the Baubataillon 146. With the invasion of the Soviet Union in June 1941 Hähle was posted to Propagandakompanie (PK) 637 to the Eastern Front to serve as a war photographer with the 6th Army. During that time he took many photos of the war from both the air and the ground. In September 1941 he was sent to a PK unit in Potsdam. At the end of September 1941 he took photos from the aftermath of the massacre of Babi Yar and another massacre near Lubny. He took 29 colour photos but did not deliver them to his unit, instead keeping them private. Hähle was wounded in the summer of 1942 and spent several weeks in hospital.

During winter 1942/1943 Hähle was a war photographer with Rommel's Afrika Korps, but was sent back to German occupied Western Europe some months later to serve with PK 698 in Belgium and Northern France. Here he shot photos of the Atlantic Wall. During the combat after the Normandy landings Hähle died on 10 June 1944 in the village of La Bijude in the north-west of Caen under unclear circumstances.

== Aftermath ==
At the end of the war American troops confiscated several lorries with material from the German propaganda units (Propagandakompanien). In 1962 the Americans passed the material to the German Federal Archives in Koblenz, together with an amount of Hähle's films. The films that Hähle kept private were sold by his widow to the Berlin journalist Hans Georg Schulz. Black and white copies of those photos were used as evidence by the Frankfurt prosecution in 1961 and vanished in an archive later. The original colour photos appeared again in 2000 when Schulz' widow sold them to the Hamburg Institute for Social Research which was able then to complete its photographic collection for the Wehrmachtsausstellung exhibition.
