= Kateryna Skarzhynska =

Early 20th and late 19th-century Ukrainian noblewoman

- Катерина Миколаївна фон Райзер
- Skarzhynska, probably circa 1880–1885
- Born: Kateryna Nikolaevna von Reiser; 17 February 1852; Lubny, Russian Empire
- Died: 1932 (aged 79–80); Ukrainian Soviet Socialist Republic
- Other names: Catherine Skarzhynska, Catherine Skarzhinsky, Ekaterina Skarzhynska, Kateryna Skarzhyns'ka, Katherine Skarzhynska
- Occupation: Philanthropist
- Spouse: Nikolai Georgievich Skarzhynsky (m. 1874; died 1910)
- Children: 6

Kateryna Mykolayivna Skarzhynska née von Reiser (Ukrainian: Катерина Миколаївна Скаржинська, 7 February 1852 O.S./19 February 1852 (N.S.) – 1932) was a Ukrainian noblewoman, philanthropist, and collector of folklore. She established the first private museum in Ukraine to house her collection of artifacts and was particularly known for her collection of pysanky, Easter eggs decorated with Ukrainian folk art. Born in Lubny to the von Reiser family, which had a long history of military service to the Russian Tsars, she was educated at home, studying in her parents' library and with select tutors. After her father died in 1859, together with her mother, brother, and maternal grandmother she moved to the Lodygyn/Lodigine family estates in the Tver province of the Russian Empire, near Moscow. There at the age of 14, von Reiser established a school for the former serfs of the estate and a public hospital.

In 1869, von Reiser became acquainted with Nikolai Georgievich Skarzhynsky, a Ukrainian nobleman and soldier. Through his circle of friends, she decided to continue her education and passed her gymnasium studies, entering the Bestuzhev Courses. They married in 1874 and later would have five children together. Five years later, he was transferred from St. Petersburg back to Ukraine. Though she did not finish her studies, Skarzhynska had developed an interest in culture and moving back to her father's estate, Kruglik, inspired her to begin collecting folk art and other artifacts. Consulting with ethnographers, archaeologists and historians, she financed archaeological excavations and amassed a large collection of items. Failing to interest local authorities in establishing a museum to house them, she created the first private museum in Ukraine in 1880. Hiring professional curators, Skarzhynska assisted in developing the collection until 1905. One of the curators, Sergiy Kulzhynskiy, would become her partner, father of her youngest child, and her companion and caretaker in her old age. In 1906, she transferred her materials to the Museum of Natural History of Poltava Provincial Zemstvo.

In addition to her work with the museum, Skarzhynska was involved in creating schools in the Poltava province. She established an agricultural school in the village of Terny in 1891; created a school for prisoners in the Lubny city jail; and built a public school on her estate at Kruglik, while organizing adult education courses. Her works were honored by the Russian government with the gold medal and ribbon of the Order of Saint Anna. In 1905, Skarzhynska separated from her husband and moved with her younger children, first to Italy, and then to Switzerland. She continued her philanthropic endeavors creating a shelter for displaced Russians living abroad, opened schools for Russian children, founded an organization for emigrants to network, created a tuberculosis hospital and various Russian printing houses to assist her compatriots who were living outside of Russia. At the outbreak of World War I, she returned to Ukraine, but as a former noble, was robbed by revolutionary troops and left penniless. Though granted a small pension by Lenin, it was later revoked and she died in 1932 during the Holodomor.

Mostly forgotten in the Soviet era, Skarzhynska is now recognized for her impact on the cultural and scientific development of Ukraine. In 1989 a street in Lubny was named after her. Her papers are housed at the Poltava Regional Studies Museum. The elementary school she founded on the Kruglik estate operated as a public school until 1943. The agricultural school she organized is now known as the Lubny Forestry College.

== Early life ==
Kateryna Nikolaevna von Reiser, known as Katya, was born 19 February 1852 N.S. (Note: Though other sources give other years for von Reiser's birth, Astryab states Katya was 7 years old when her father died, i.e. born 1852. He was the head archivist at Lubny from 1921 to 1925 and wrote that his information on the Reisers came from old documents stored in the Poltava provincial museum, where he consulted them between 1917 and 1920. The records were destroyed in 1941, and his manuscript was found in the archives of Pushkin House in St. Petersburg, where it had been sent for publication in 1923.) in Lubny, in the Russian Empire, to Ekaterina Petrovna (née Lodygyna/Lodigines-Cyrus) and Nikolai von Reiser. Her father's family, though German in origin, had a long-standing history of service to the Tsars. Vincent-Martin Stepanovich von Reiser, a lawyer in the Swedish army, was taken as a prisoner of war by Peter the Great's army during the Battle of Poltava in 1711. He joined the tsar's service working as an artillery and mining specialist. His son, also Vincent, served as an aide-de-camp to Peter III of Russia and later was promoted to Lieutenant-General by Catherine the Great. Wilhelm Ulrich Vikentievich von Reiser also served in the Russian army, accompanying Suvorov to Switzerland, as did his son and Katya's father, Nikolai, who participated in the Battle of Warsaw. As her father spent much of his time away from the family, Katya and her brother Misha were raised mostly by her mother and maternal grandmother, Varvara Petrovna Lodygina.

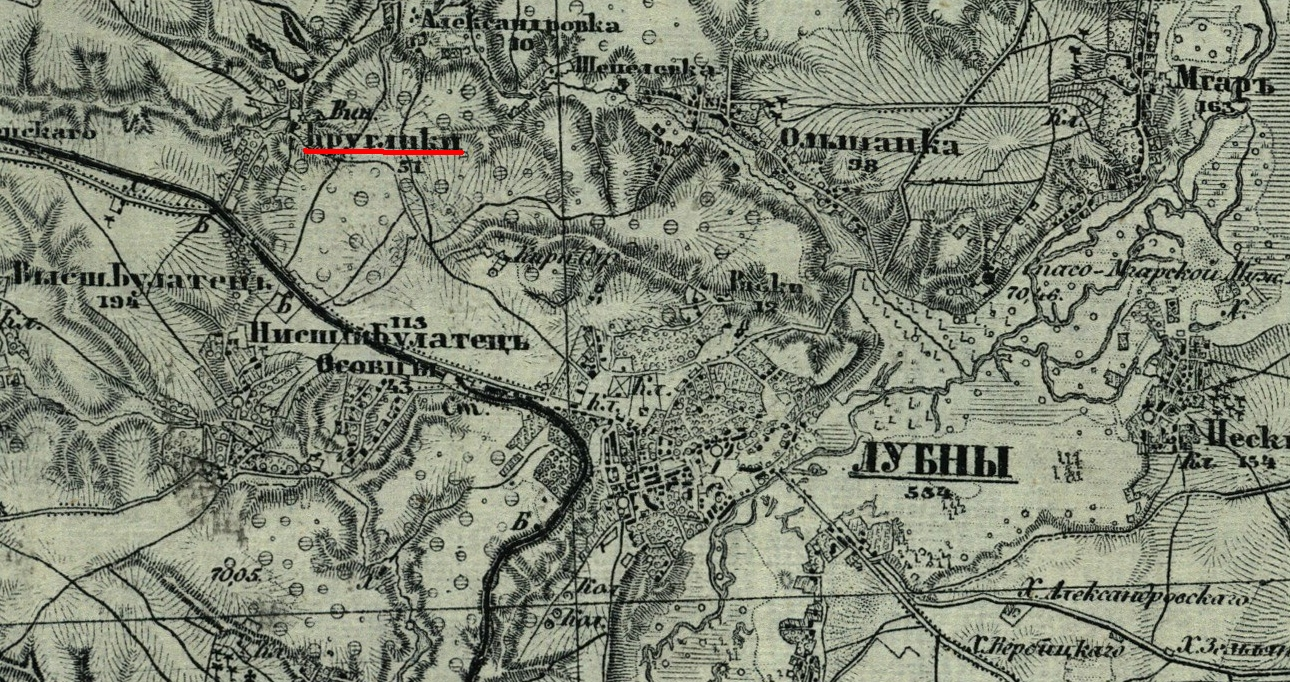
Location of the Kruglik estate in 1878

Von Reiser's early education was at home, where she drew on her parents' extensive library. Her parents had many intellectual friends and they were often visited by the geologist Konstantin Feofilaktov, who became an early mentor to von Reiser. She mastered both French and German. The family lived on the Kruglik estate purchased by her father in Lubny, until his death from typhus at the fortress of Novogeorgievsk in 1859. When von Reiser was 10, they moved to the Lodygyn/Lodigine family estates in the Tver province, but within a few years moved to Moscow and then St. Petersburg in search of the best tutors for her home studies. These pedagogues were selected by her uncle, Alexander Apukhtin, who was a trustee of the Warsaw School District, and included Aleksey N. Ostrogorsky and Pavel M. Shpilevsky. Though her grandmother wanted Katya to become a maid of honour to the imperial court, at the age of 12, von Reiser decided she would dedicate her life to helping the poor.

== Career ==
=== Philanthropy 1866–1905 ===
When she turned 14, von Reiser set up a school for the former serfs on her grandparents' estate in Nikolskoye in the Vyshnevolotsky Uyezd and worked alongside the teacher she hired. She also established a hospital to treat local patients. In 1869, she became acquainted with Nikolai Georgievich Skarzhynsky, a nobleman, who became a major general in the Russian Army, specializing in providing horses for the cavalry. Skarzhynsky was descended of a noble-Cossack family of Polish-Ukrainian roots, through Ivan Mikhailovich Skarzhinsky, of the Lubny Regiment. His friends, who were part of the Russian intelligentsia, inspired her to continue with her education and she passed the exams for the women's gymnasium in Lubny. She then attended the Bestuzhev Courses in St. Petersburg, visiting cultural landmarks, such as the Hermitage Museum and the Russian Academy of the Arts. In 1874, she married Skarzhynsky at the Church of the Greatmartyr George in Kiev. The couple returned to St. Petersburg, where she continued her studies until 1879, when they were interrupted by her husband's transfer back to Ukraine.

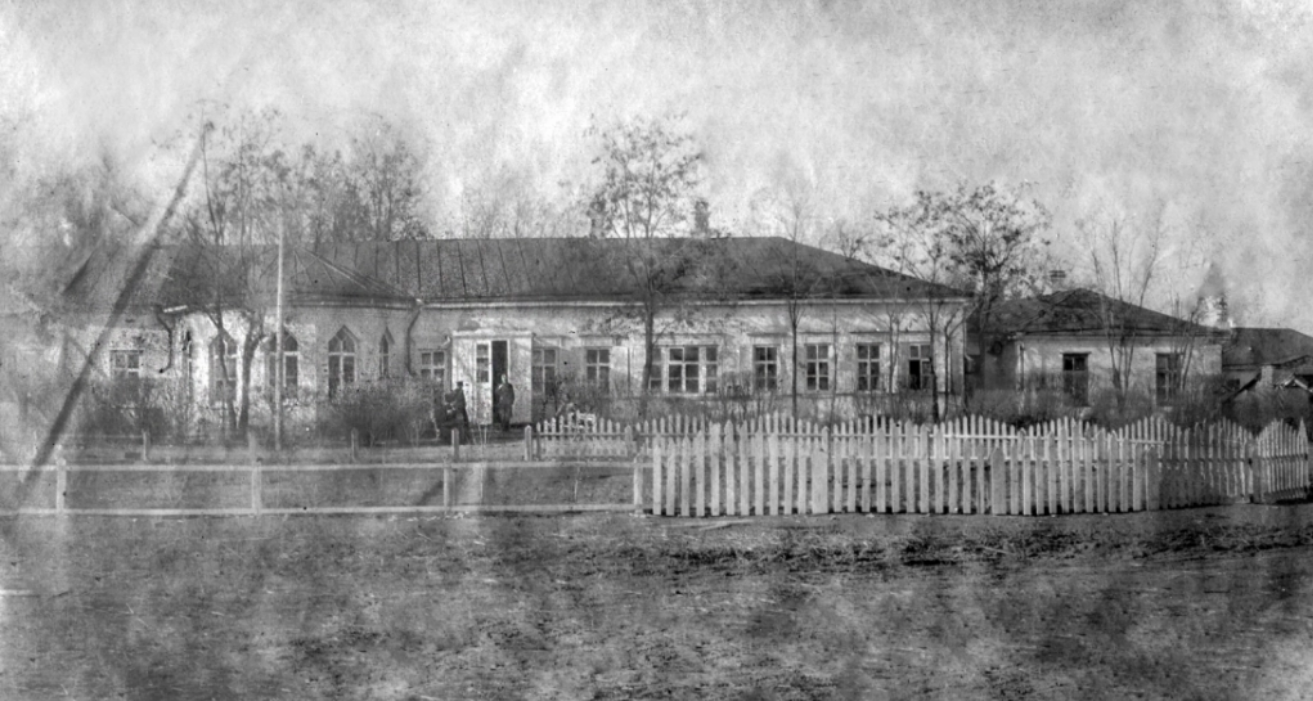
Home of Nikolai Georgievich Skarzhynsky on the Kruglik estate

Skarzhynska returned to her family estate at Kruglik, where she and her husband lived in separate houses. They had an open relationship, each able to have other relationships, without hostility between the couple. She and Skarzhynsky would have five children: Kateryna, Volodymyr, Olga, Alexander, and Natalia. Fascinated by the local folk art and handicrafts, she began collecting artifacts, with the help of historian Grigory Kiryakov. In 1880, Skarzhynska founded the first private museum in Ukraine, collaborating with the noted archaeologist and curator Fyodor Kaminsky on its organization. Kaminsky worked at the museum from 1881 to 1891 as the head curator. The museum was originally housed in a room in the Skarzhynsky's home, but later expanded to a two-story structure with a lobby and six exhibit halls, adjacent to a park and greenhouse. She corresponded with many scientists from throughout Russia and participated in archaeological seminars, as well as fact-finding trips. In 1883, Skarzhynska traveled to Moscow and St. Petersburg, visiting the Polytechnic Museum, Rumyantsev Museum and State Historical Museum to study materials and acquire knowledge and equipment for running her own museum. That year she also met with officials from the Moscow Archaeological Society and Kiev University Archaeological Museum.

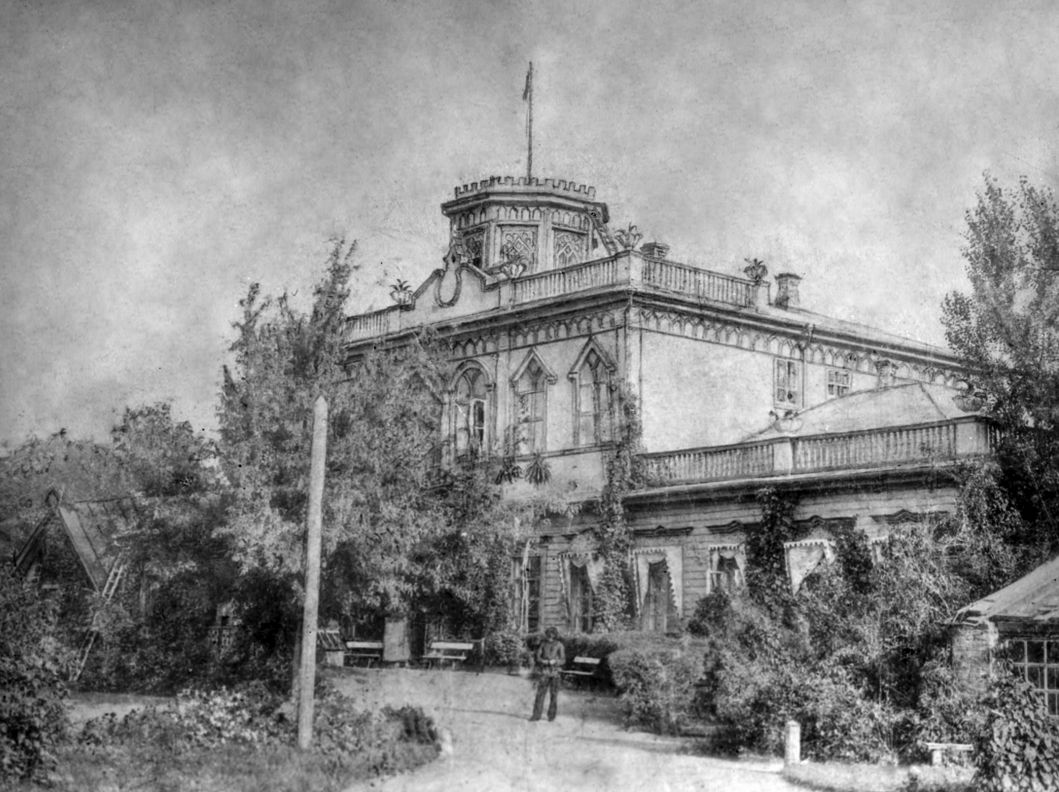
Home of Kateryna Skarzhynska on the Kruglik estate

Skarzhynska made archaeological excavations in the mountains near Lubny and led expeditions to dig in the Posulli grounds, an historic area covering the Sula River basin. She also paid for excavations by Kaminsky and others, and established a program where she would pay a reward for the recovery of iconostasis and other artifacts, details of the history of rural churches, and items of local historic interest. She amassed a large collection of Ukrainian folk art on Easter eggs known as pysanky. She tried to interest the city of Lubny in establishing a museum for her collection, but they felt the expense for such a luxury was unjustified. Skarzhynska went ahead and established the museum herself. Skarzhynska did not charge for entry to the museum, which contained over 35,000 items, including archaeological artifacts, coins, Cossack antiquities, personal archives and autographs of notable Ukrainian families, and 4,000 books, housed in a scientific library. Her activities on behalf of the museum resulted in her election to several scientific societies, including the Moscow Numismatic Society and the Society of Devotees of Natural Science, Anthropology, and Ethnography.

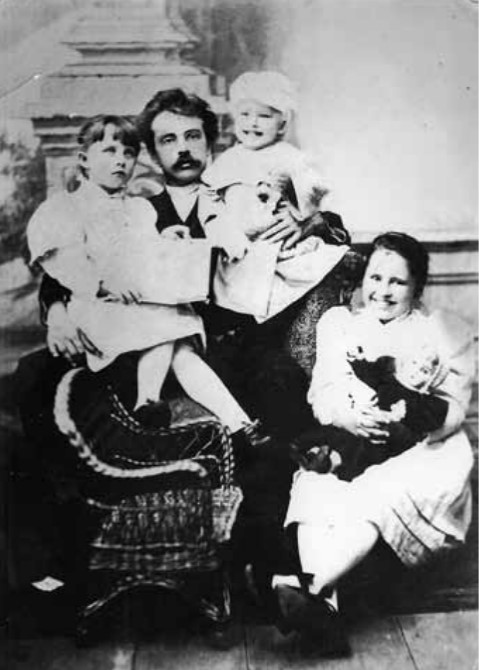
Kulzhynskiy, with his students: Natalia, Igor, and Olga Skarzhynsky, 1895-1896

In 1891, Kaminsky left the museum, and died later that same year, after recommending hiring his assistant, Sergiy Klimentiyovich Kulzhynskiy as replacement curator. Kulzhynskiy had originally arrived at Kruglik in 1889, and upon Kaminsky's recommendation became the tutor for the Skarzhynsky children, Olga, Volodymyr, and Natalia. That year, Skarzhynska established an agricultural school on land owned by her husband in the village of Terny, donating the land to the local Zemstvo. She next established a school in the city jail at Lubny and then a girls' gymnasium. In 1898, she built a school on the estate, which had two classrooms, a laboratory, library, museum, and a recreation hall, as well as quarters for the instructor. She hired an instructor from Moscow, Victor Vasilyevich Simonovsky, to teach at the school and shared the expenses of its operation with the Zemstvo. The free, public, coeducational school offered courses for four grades in music, natural sciences, religion, Russian calligraphy and grammar, Russian literature, and Russian geography and history. She employed several former prisoners as clerk, night watchman, and gardener; in the 1905 revolution one of them became a local leader of the rebellion, and ordered her to be protected. Her husband had been made an honorary superintendent of the Lubny School District, and though he supported her collecting, he was not involved in her other philanthropic endeavors and did not support her publishing efforts or meetings with scientists. Skarzhynska and the tutor, Kulzhynskiy, began an affair. He was the father of her youngest son Igor. (Note: Numerous sources allude to the relationship between Skarzhynska and Kulzhynskiy and their parentage of Igor. Кулатова and Сидоренко in their article edited by Suprunenko, state «Сергей Климентьевич Кульжинский приехал молодым студентом в дом Скаржинских в качестве учителя детей. Здесь он ув-лекся красивой и умной Екатериной Николаевной, попадает в фавориты, имеет от нее сына...») Her works in education were recognized by the Russian government with the gold medal and ribbon of the Order of Saint Anna.

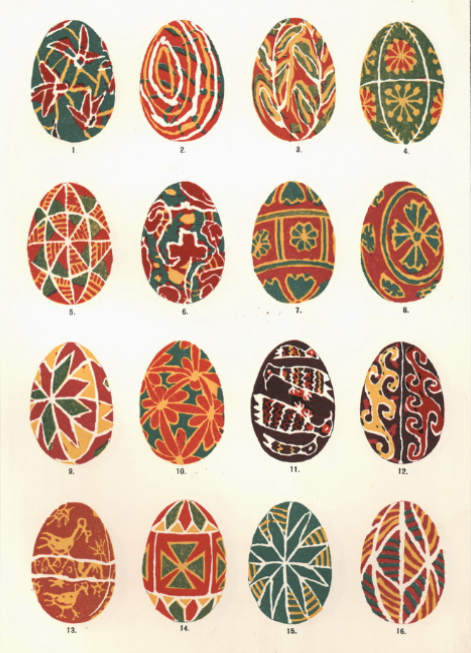
Sample of pysanky from the collection of Skarzhynska, 1899

Skarzhynska offered evening adult education courses at the museum. She continued collecting pysanky and by 1898, her collection contained more than 2,100 eggs. These were catalogued by Skarzhynska and published in 1899 by Kulzhynskiy in a book Description of the Collection of Pysanky (Ukrainian: Описаніе коллекціи народныхъ писанокъ). The collection attracted many visitors, both local people and visiting scientists. By 1901, there were up to 300 visitors a day. In both 1903 and 1905, Skarzhynska offered the museum to the city of Lubny, but her offers were refused. She began making plans to leave Russia in 1905, recognizing that a revolution would make maintaining it impossible. She operated the museum until she left for Europe, finally giving her collections to the Poltava Zemstvo in 1906, transferring over 37,000 objects in four railway boxcars. That year, the Museum of Natural History of Poltava Provincial Zemstvo made a second edition of her collection of pysanky, which included over 3,000 drawings. In 1943, the museum was looted and burned and only 458 specimens of her eggs survived.

=== Life abroad 1905–1914 ===
The financial collapse and chaos preceding and during the 1905 Russian Revolution, led Skarzhynsky to suffer a mental breakdown. Placing her husband in a private asylum in Kiev, (Note: In Arnold Bax's memoirs, edited version by Foreman, note 62 explains that Bax used pseudonyms for Natalia "Skarginski", their companion Olga Antoniettі, and other family members. He referred to Natalia as Loubya Korolenko; her mother as Madame Korolenko; Antonietti as Fiammetta; and Olga and Lvov Klimov, as Olga and Lev Kiriloff.) Skarzhynska and the tutor, Kulzhynskiy, took the youngest two children, Igor and Natalia, and a foster child, Olga Kiryakova, to Italy for their education. For five years, they moved throughout Europe living in various cities, like Budapest and Vienna, before settling in Lausanne, Switzerland. Her husband died in 1910 and Skarzhynska sold her remaining land holdings, donating a portion to the continuation of the agricultural school. Between 1906 and 1907, many Russians emigrated in the wake of the Revolution out of fear of persecution for their political beliefs or activities. Many of these emigrants realized that they would have to live abroad indefinitely. To assist them, Skarzhynska purchased a four-storey house, known as the Russian Home, and made it available to any Russian immigrants and refugees needing a place to stay, while they sought housing or employment. She opened schools for Russian students, bringing in educational materials from Moscow. In Geneva, she founded the Union of Russian Emigrants, where Russians could meet and help each other. She established canteens in various Swiss cities, established a sanatorium for Russian tuberculosis patients in Davos, and set up Russian printing houses in Brussels, London and Paris. In Russian circles, she became widely known as the central contact person for assistance to Russians living abroad.

Skarzhynska's activities helped many political dissidents, drawing attention from the Swiss gendarmes and the Russian intelligence. Among her acquaintances and correspondents in Switzerland were both Lenin and Stalin. She published a magazine in Russian, Зарубежом (Abroad), which carried articles of interest, like the forced exodus of Georgians from their homeland and information on the Balkan Wars (1912–1913). She pressed the federal government of Switzerland to provide a nursery for the orphans of Bulgarian, Greek, Serbian, and Turkish soldiers who were killed during the Balkan wars and raised the funds to finance it. Though she was apolitical, her journal carried evaluations of various revolutionary movements, including from leaders of both the Bolsheviks and Mensheviks, in an attempt to explore the ideological thought of her time. In 1913, she broke off all relations with revolutionaries, believing they had used her dreams of improving education to advance their own agendas.

=== Return to Ukraine 1914–1932 ===
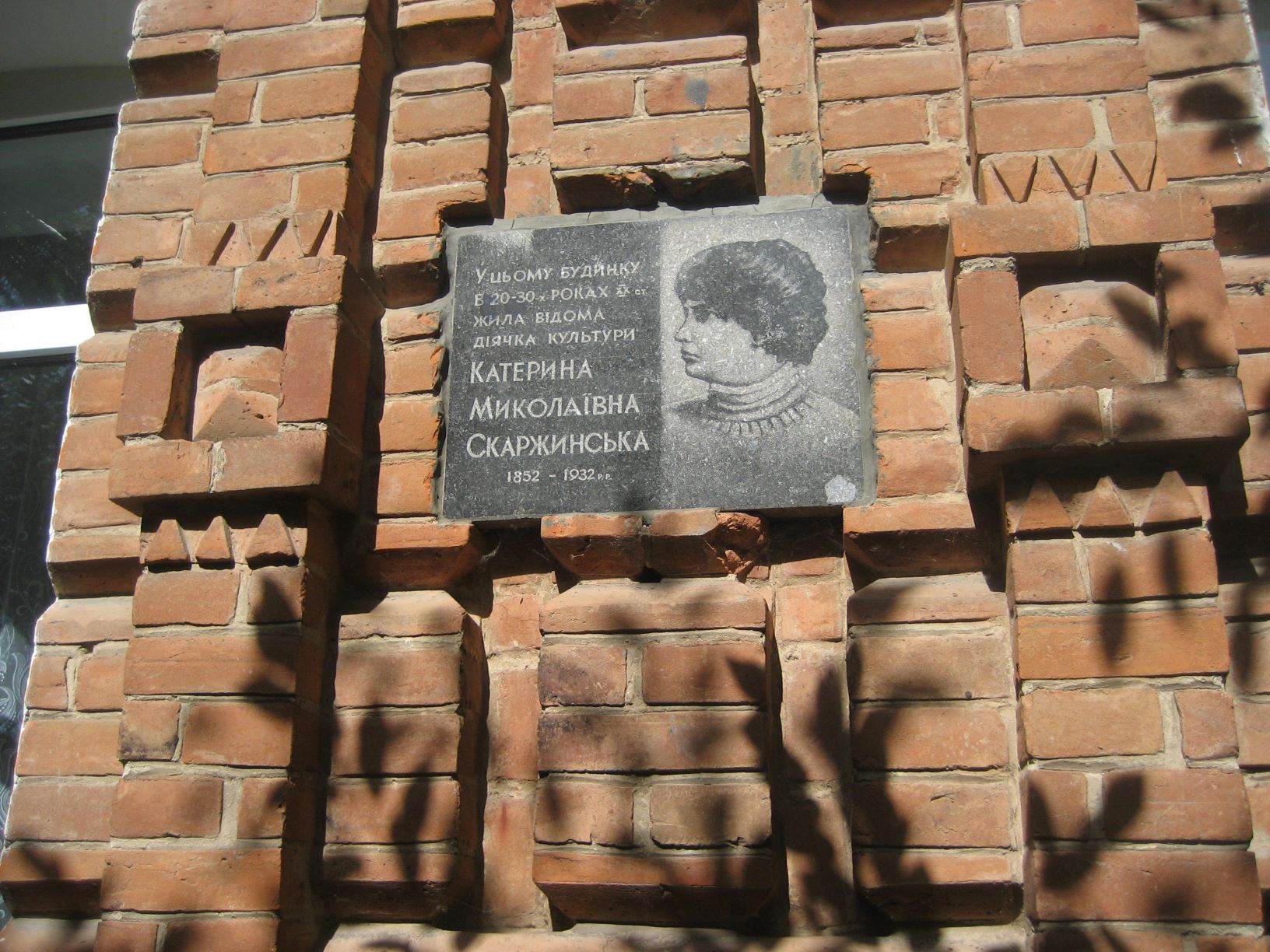
Plaque on 10 Gogol Street, Lubny

With the outbreak of World War I, Skarzhynska and Kulzhynskiy returned to Ukraine. She initially went to Kiev and then moved to Poltava, before finally settling in Lubny in 1916. She set about collecting books to establish children's libraries for Poltava and Lubny, but she had to abandon the project, when she lost her fortune during the chaos of World War I and the Russian Revolution. In 1918, one of the military units occupied the coeducational gymnasium operated by Skarzhynska's daughter Olga, where Kulzhynskiy was teaching, and looted the premises, stealing the personal belongings and identity papers of the students and staff. In July 1923, the employees of the museum which she had founded, then known as the Poltava Proletarian Museum, sent her a one-time donation of ₽1,000 (Note: In 1923, $1 US was the equivalent of over 2 million rubles. Bread in the US averaged 9 to 12¢ per pound (loaf) in the 1920s. The equivalent cost of bread in Ukraine during the period was ₽25 per kilogram (2 loaves).) while the employees of the Poltava Central Archive sent her a further ₽500. The head archivist wrote a letter to the Russian Academy of Sciences the following year, asking for the "government of the proletariat" to grant a pension to Skarzhynska, who had worked so long on behalf of common people. The plea was successful as Lenin's Soviet government granted her a personal pension. In the late 1920s, the death of Lenin and the curtailment of his influence, along with her former noble status, resulted in the pension's cancellation. Kulzhynskiy, who was working as an assistant professor of physics and headed the physics and mathematics department at the Institute of Social Education in Lubny (Ukrainian: Інституту соціального виховання в Лубнах), provided for her care in her final years. (Note: Suprunenko notes that Skarzhynska's son Igor abandoned his children in 1924, and she and Kulzhynskiy took in Vsevolod Igorevich and Vadim Igorevich Skarzhynsky, their mother Natalia Georgevna, and Natalia's mother, Alexandra Silvestrovna Kasyanenko. After Skarzhynska death, Kulzhynskiy devoted himself to their education and both of his grandchildren became noted geologists.)

== Death and legacy ==
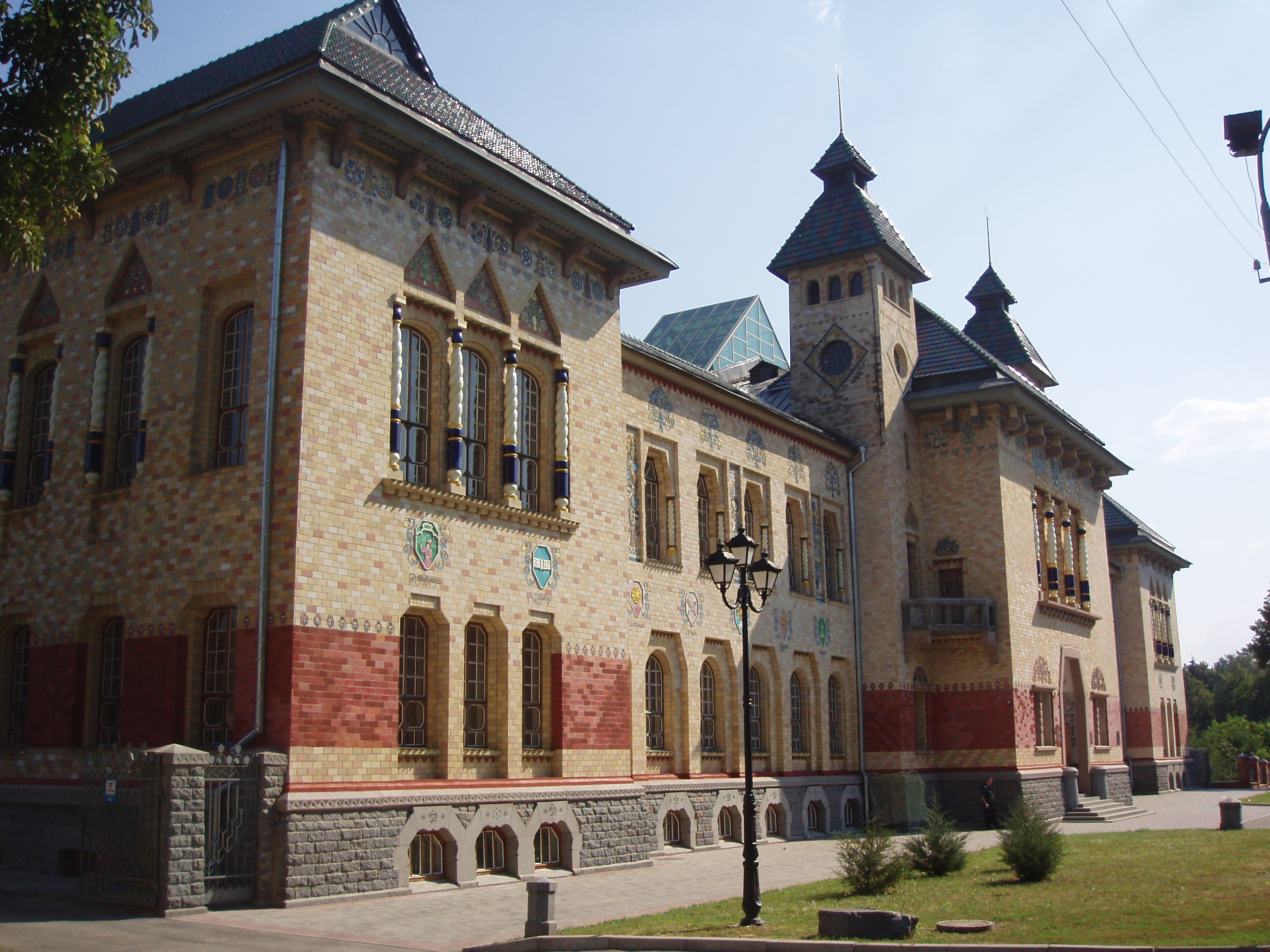
Poltava Museum of Local History, which houses Skarzhynska's papers and some of her collection of artifacts

Skarzhynska died in the summer of 1932, during the Holodomor, though accounts differ as to where she died or where she was buried. (Note: Sergienko indicates she died and was buried in Kruglik, which is confirmed by Obelets. Belusko identifies her place of death as Lubny and her burial at the Lubny City Cemetery. Ilchenko notes that sources are divided with some saying her place of burial is unknown and her death occurred in Lubny, while other sources indicate the death occurred in Kruglik.) There is a plaque located on the house at 10 Gogol Street in Lubny which marks her residence there during the 1920s and 1930s. Her activities had a "significant impact on the development of cultural and scientific life in Ukraine in the late nineteenth and early twentieth centuries". Her oldest daughter and namesake Kateryna Nikolaevna Skarzhynska died of starvation soon after her mother. Many years after her death, in 1989, a street in the city of Lubny was named in her honor. Her papers, including her books, historical documents, and manuscripts are housed at the Poltava Museum of Local History, in Poltava, Ukraine.

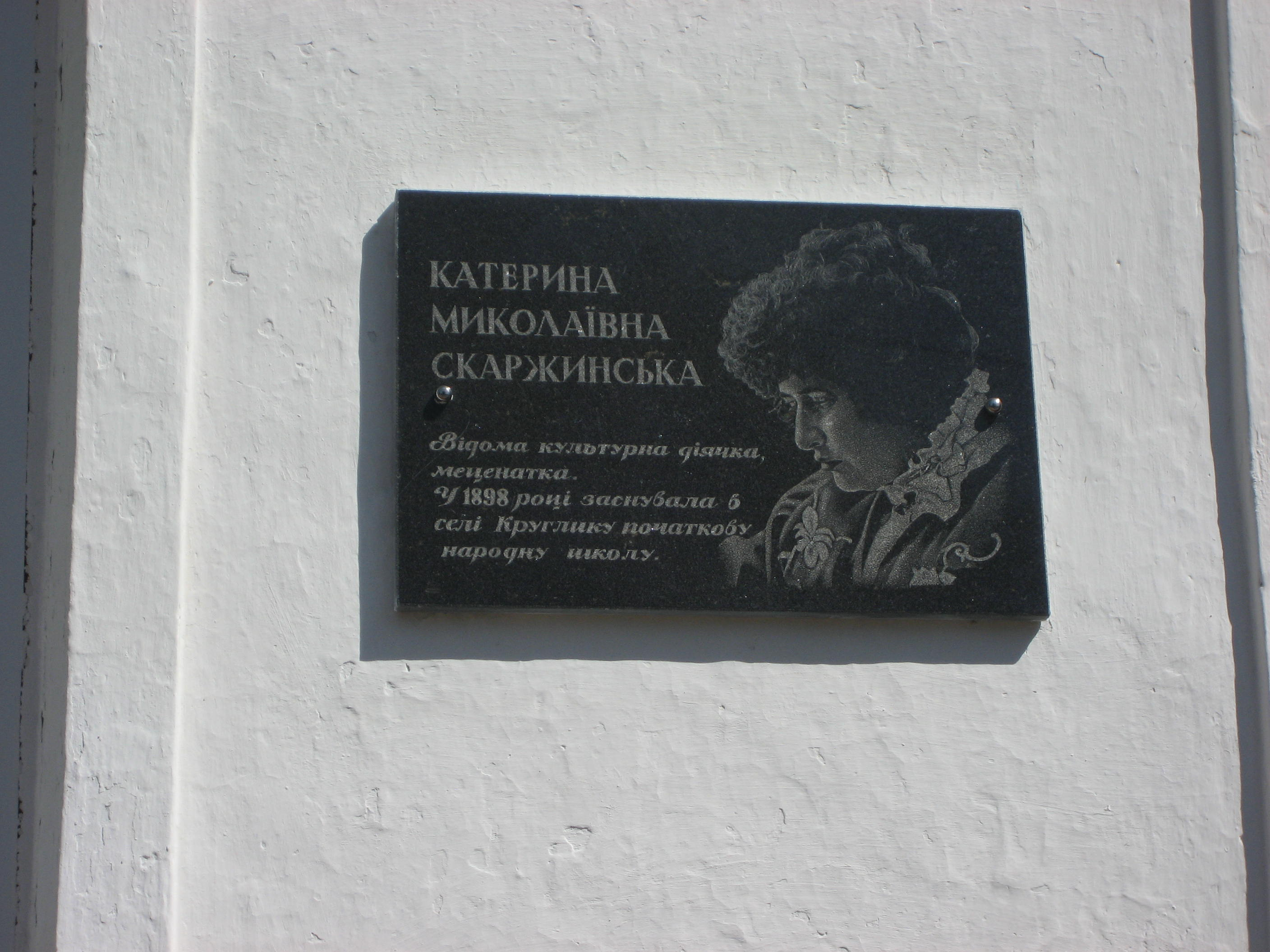
Plaque at Kruglik School

The elementary school Skarzhynska founded on the Kruglik estate, operated until 1943 and her daughter, Olga Skarzhynska (later Klimova), followed in her footsteps. Olga founded "one of the first Ukrainian-language high schools in Luben" (Lubny), open to students of any nationality or gender. The agricultural school Skarzhynska founded in Terny became an agricultural and technical college in 1917. Students were trained in blacksmithing, coopering, and carpentry, in addition to studying farming techniques. In 2005, the school was transformed into the Lubny Forestry College, a leading institution in Ukraine for training in forestry production. Her daughter Natalia was a romantic interest of the English composer Arnold Bax and his May Night in the Ukraine was dedicated to her. He also wrote about her and her family in his memoir, "Farewell My Youth", published in 1943.
