= Terny, Lubny Raion, Poltava Oblast =

Rural locality in Poltava Oblast, Ukraine

Coordinates: 49°58′30″N 32°59′10″E

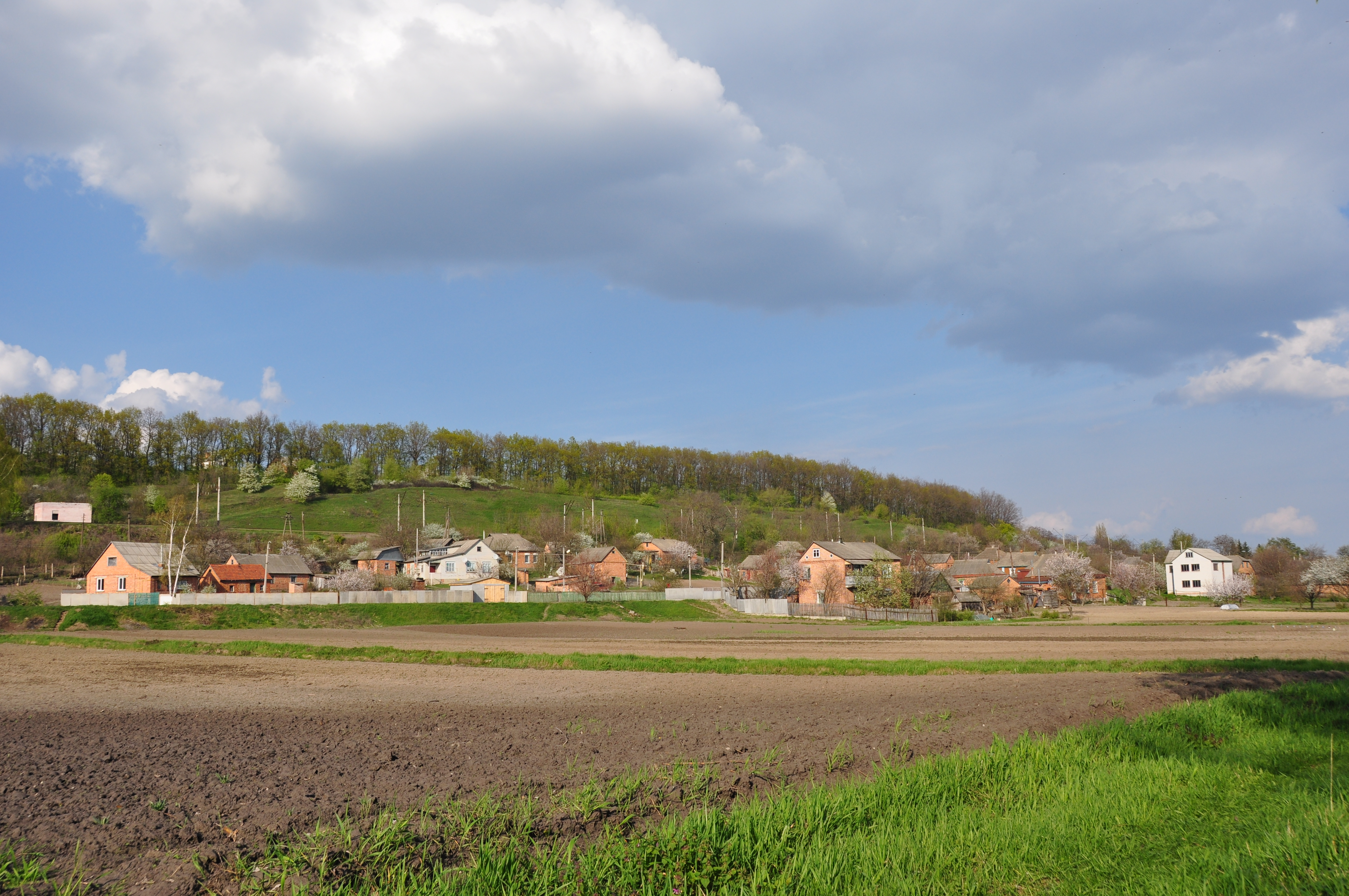
View of Terny from the south

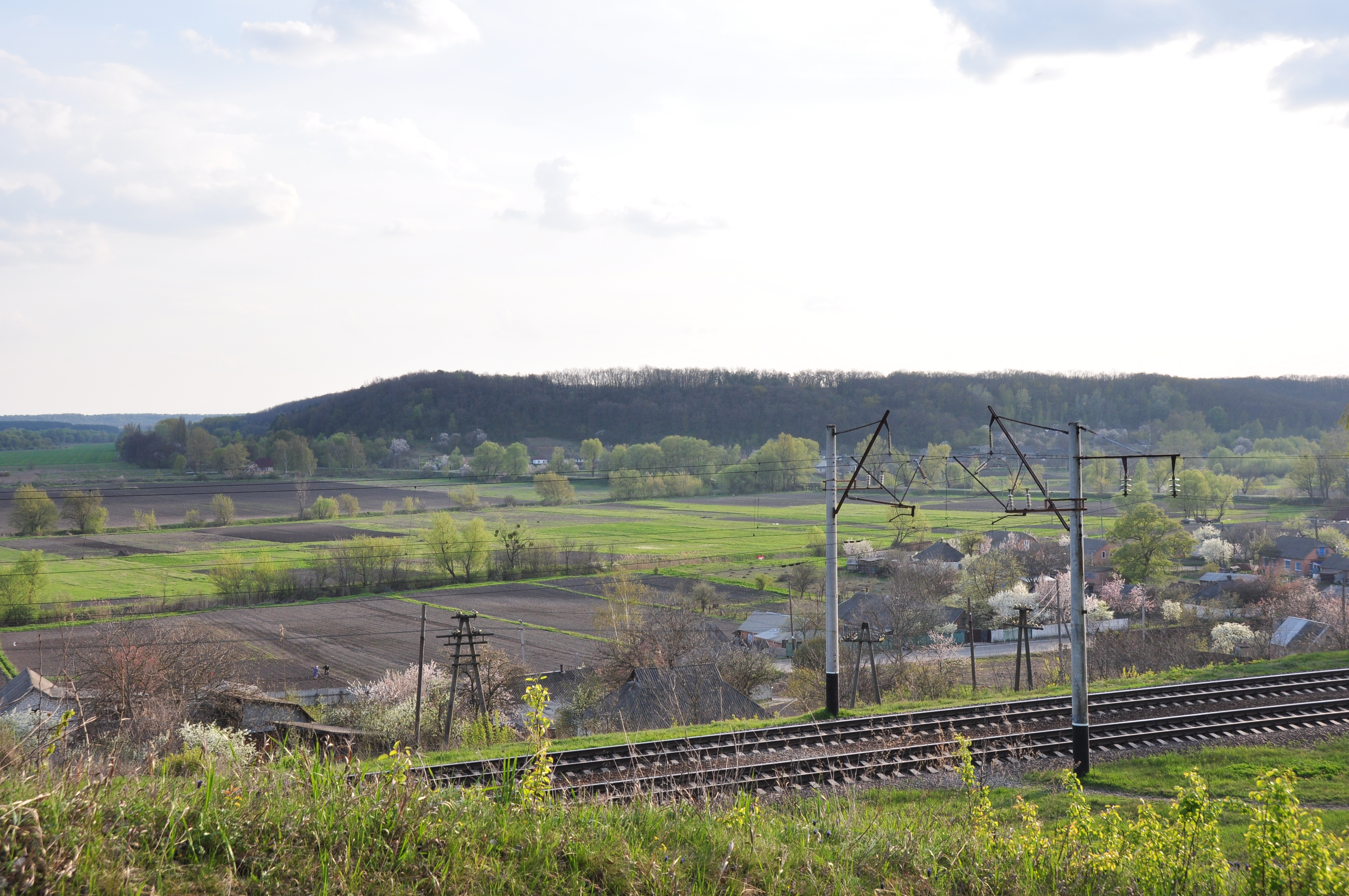
View of Terny from the north

Terny (Ukrainian: Терни) is a village in Ukraine in Lubny Raion (district) of Poltava Oblast. It belongs to Lubny urban hromada, one of the hromadas of Ukraine. In 2001, there were 471 inhabitants. Terny is situated on the right bank of the river Sula.

== History ==
In the 17th century Jeremi Wiśniowiecki gave the village to Lubny Bernardine Monastery. Catholic monks founded in Terny the garden on 12 dessiatins. In 1657, after the destroying of Bernardine monastery in Lubny, the village was given to Mhar Monastery by Bohdan Khmelnytsky.

1721 Peter the Great founded in Terny and Lubny two "pharmacy gardens" on the area of 50 dessiatins. 1781 - the village was without church, with 30 huts, there were 134 inhabitants in 1787.

1880 - upon request of the Department of Agriculture Kateryna Skarzhynska donated 30 dessiatins of land in the village Terny for the foundation of the agricultural school. In 1929 this school was reorganized to the College of Medicinal and Aromatic Plants, and in 1950 - to the Forest College.

1903 - there were 335 inhabitants in Terny. The village was without church, belonged to Vyazivok parish.

== Religion ==
From 2011 in Terny is the Eastern Orthodox church dedicated to St. John the Apostle. Feast day celebrated on May 21.

== People from Terny ==
- Natalia Baklay, Ukrainian poet
