= Szymon Syrski =

Polish zoologist

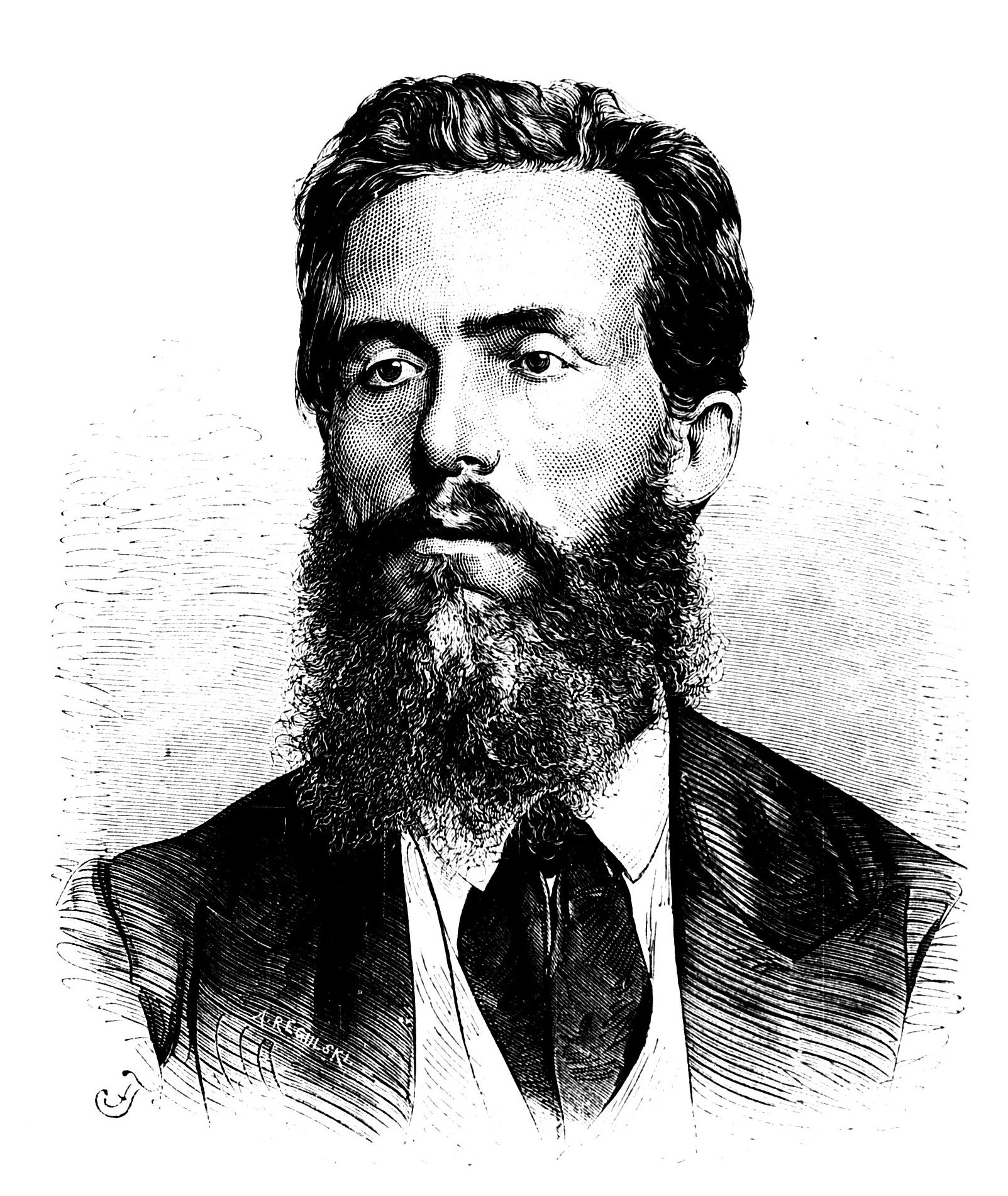
Szymon Syrski

Szymon Syrski (24 October 1829, in Łubnie – 13 January 1882, in Lwów) was a Polish zoologist. He was a professor of zoology at Lviv University.
