= Lubny =

City in Poltava Oblast, Ukraine

Lubny Лубни
- City
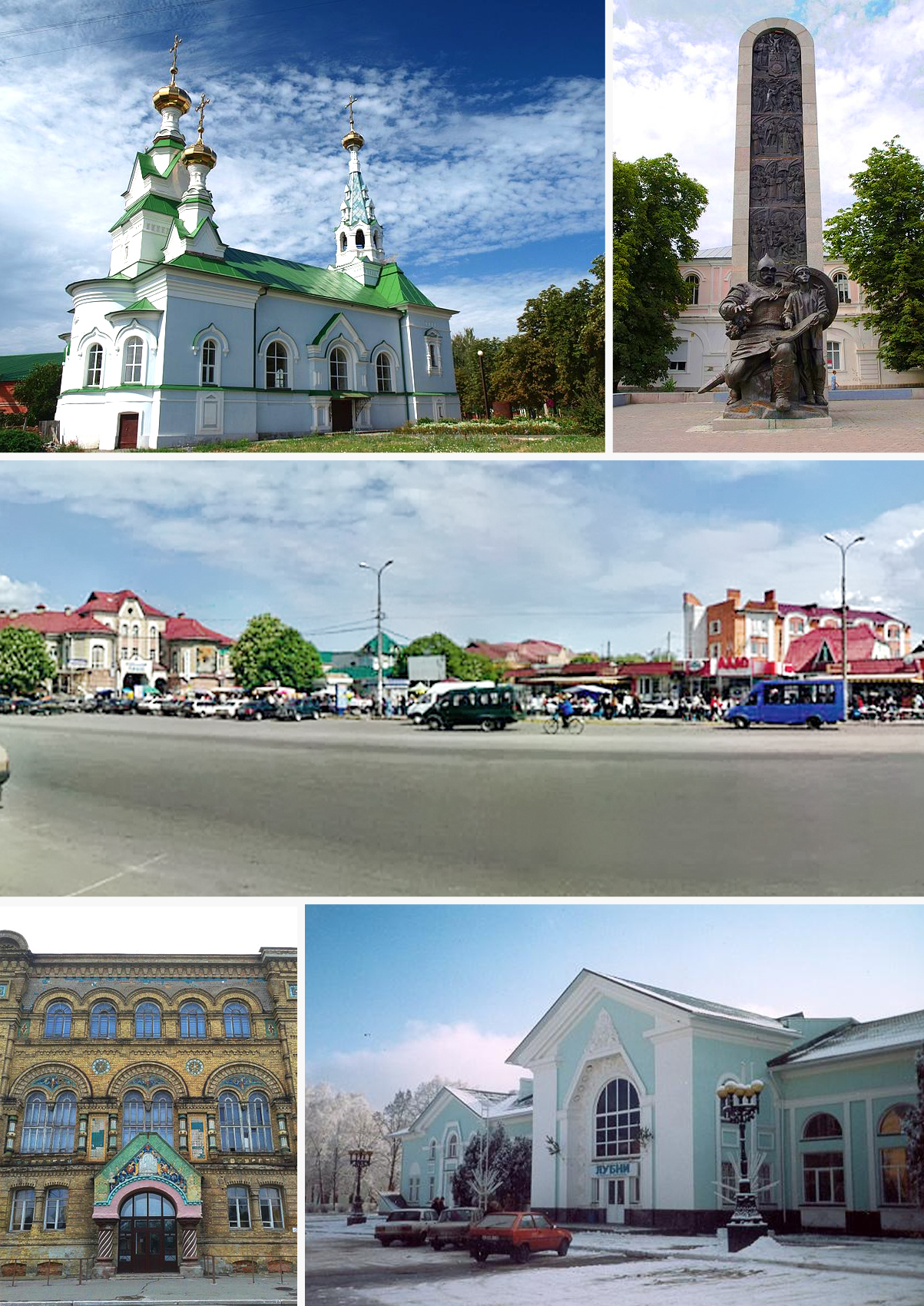
- Upper row: Church of the Nativity of the Blessed Virgin, Monument to Lubny`s millennium. Middle row: Yarmarkova (Fair) Square. Lower row: facade of school No. 10, building of the Lubny railway station

- Flag Coat of arms
- Interactive map of Lubny
- Location of Lubny Lubny (Ukraine)
- Coordinates: 50°01′N 33°00′E
- Country: Ukraine
- Oblast: Poltava Oblast
- Raion: Lubny Raion
- Hromada: Lubny urban hromada
- Founded: 988

Government
  - Mayor: Oleksandr Hrycajenko

Area
  - Total: 45.6 km^{2} (17.6 sq mi)
- Elevation: 158 m (518 ft)

Population (2022)
  - Total: 44,089
- Time zone: UTC+2 (EET)
  - Summer (DST): UTC+3 (EET)
- Postal code: 37500
- Area code: +380 5361
- Website: lubnyrada.gov.ua

Lubny (Ukrainian: Лубни, pronounced [lʊbˈnɪ]), historically also called Lubni (Ukrainian: Лубні) is a city in Poltava Oblast, central Ukraine. It serves as the administrative center of Lubny Raion. It also hosts the administration of Lubny urban hromada, one of the hromadas of Ukraine. Population: 44,089 (2022 estimate).

== History ==
Lubny is reputed to be one of the oldest cities in Ukraine, allegedly founded in 988 by knyaz (prince) Vladimir the Great (Volodymyr) of Kyiv. The first written record, however, dates from 1107, when a battle against the Polovtsians took place nearby. The settlement was originally known as Luben (Ukrainian: Лубень). Initially, it was a small wooden fortress above the Sula River.

Neglected after the 12th century, the settlement restored its importance during the late 16th century, when it was owned by the powerful Wisniowiecki family. The town was ruled by Magdeburg rights and had a coat of arms. In 1596, Lubny was the site of the last battle of Severyn Nalyvaiko against the Poles. In the 17th century the city was one of the largest in the area. In 1638 it had 2,646 inhabitants.

After Khmelnytsky Uprising, between 1648 and 1781, the town was the headquarters of the Lubny Cossack Regiment. In 1782 Lubny became an uyezd center of Kiev Viceroyalty, in 1793 the town was included into Malorossiya Governorate, since 1802 - into Poltava Governorate At the time, Lubny was famous as a centre of baking, and locally produced korovai and paska breads were greatly popular, even deserving a mention in Ivan Kotliarevskyi's Eneida. The population of Lubny increased from around 3,000 as of 1860 to 10,000 in 1897. After a railroad line was constructed in 1901, industry grew rapidly and expanded in the city.

During the Revolution of 1905 a self-defence group was formed by Ukrainian activists in Lubny in order to protect the community from the Black Hundreds. Among its active members was Andriy Livytskyi, the future head of the Ukrainian People's Republic in exile. Members of the force, also known as "Lubny Republic", were later persecuted by Tsarist authorities on accusations of separatism. Following the 17 October Manifesto Khliborob (Ukrainian: Хлібороб - "Peasant"), the first Ukrainian language newspaper in Dnieper Ukraine, was published in Lubny. A local newspaper Lubenshchyna has been circulating in the city since July 1917.

In 1918 Lubny was the site of battles between the Zaporozhian Division of the Ukrainian People's Republic and the Bolsheviks. By 1926 the city's population had grown to 21,000.

During the German occupation in the Second World War, Lubny was the centre of major partisan (resistance) movement. Two Nazi concentration camps were located there. On 16 October 1941 over a thousand of the city's Jews, including women and children, were massacred by German Einsatzgruppen on the outskirts of the city. The action, all the way until the execution, was thoroughly documented by photographer Johannes Hähle.

Under the Soviet rule Lubny served as a centre of machine-building, mechanical, construction, tobacco, textile, furniture, food and pharmaceutical industries, housing an agricultural research station, technical and medical schools and a museum.

Until 18 July 2020, Lubny was designated as a city of oblast significance and did not belong to Lubny Raion even though it was the center of the raion. As part of the administrative reform in Ukraine, which reduced the number of raions of Poltava Oblast to four, the city was merged into Lubny Raion.

== Modern Lubny ==
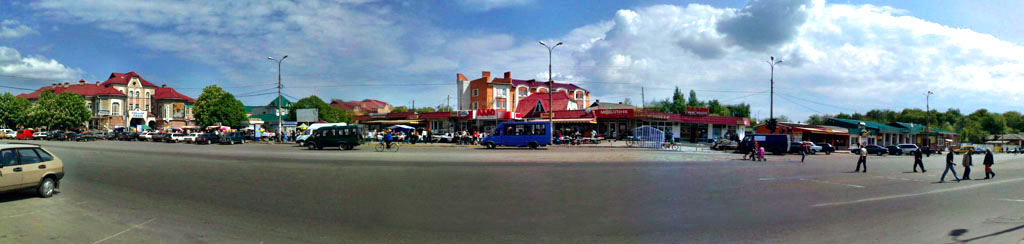
Market square in Lubny

Today, Lubny is a large industrial and cultural centre. Many automotive and farm equipment factories were established during the growth of industry between 1901 and the 1930s. As well, Lubny is a major producer of meat and milk products, furniture and bread. Over 40 types of ice cream are made in the milk factory, and the Lubny bread is known across Ukraine.

Lubny also has its own soccer team, FC Lubny. Several museums and art galleries are located there, and the Lubny institute district is known for the bookstores that carry a wide variety of technical and non-technical books.

A second local newspaper, Visnyk (Вісник) has been published in the city since 1994.

The main landmark of the Lubny District is the Mharsky Monastery, with a large six-pillared Ukrainian Baroque cathedral, built in 1684–92 and renovated after a conflagration in 1754, and a neoclassical bell tower, started in 1784 but not completed until 1844.

=== Historical monuments ===
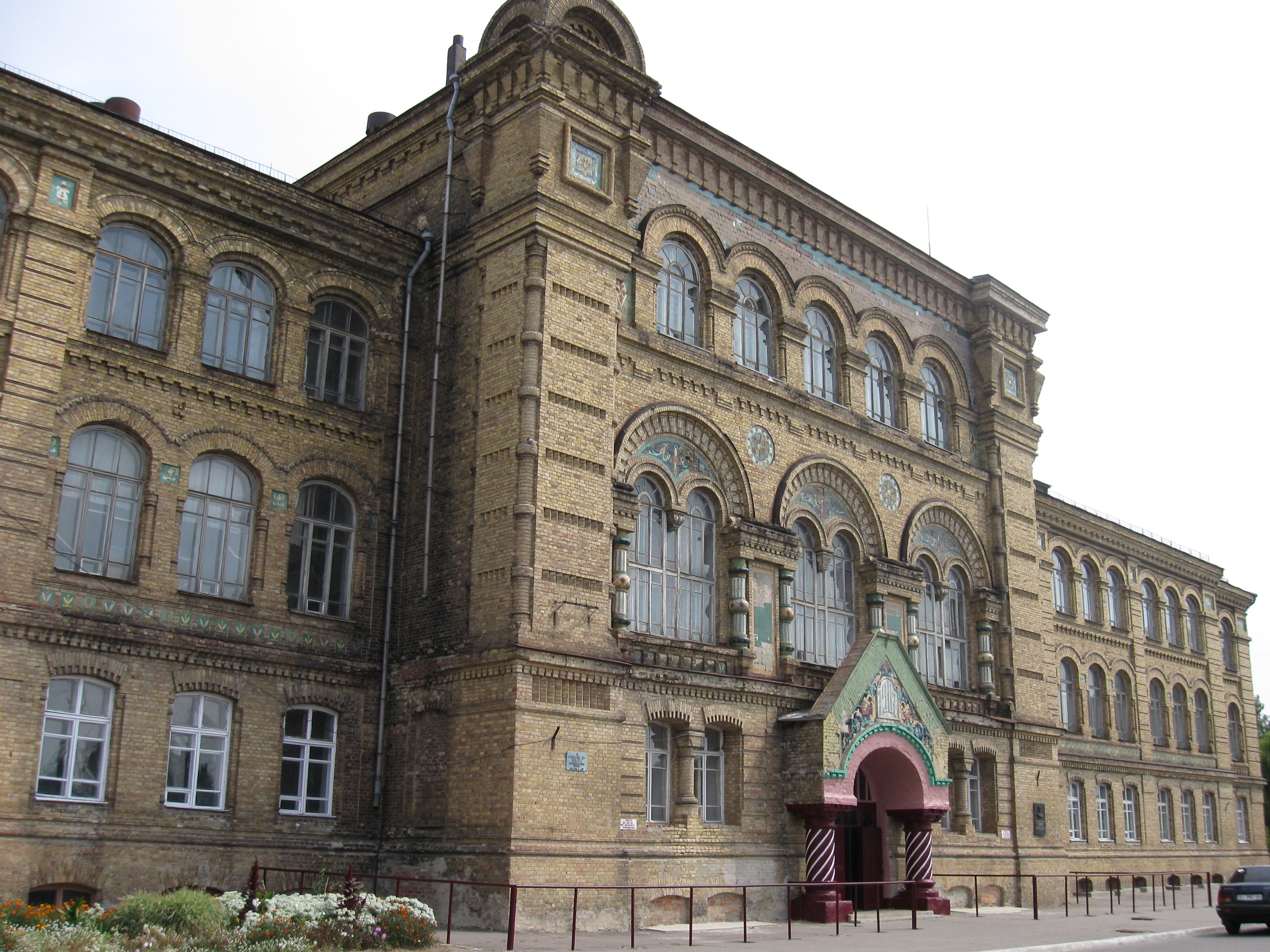
A school in Lubny

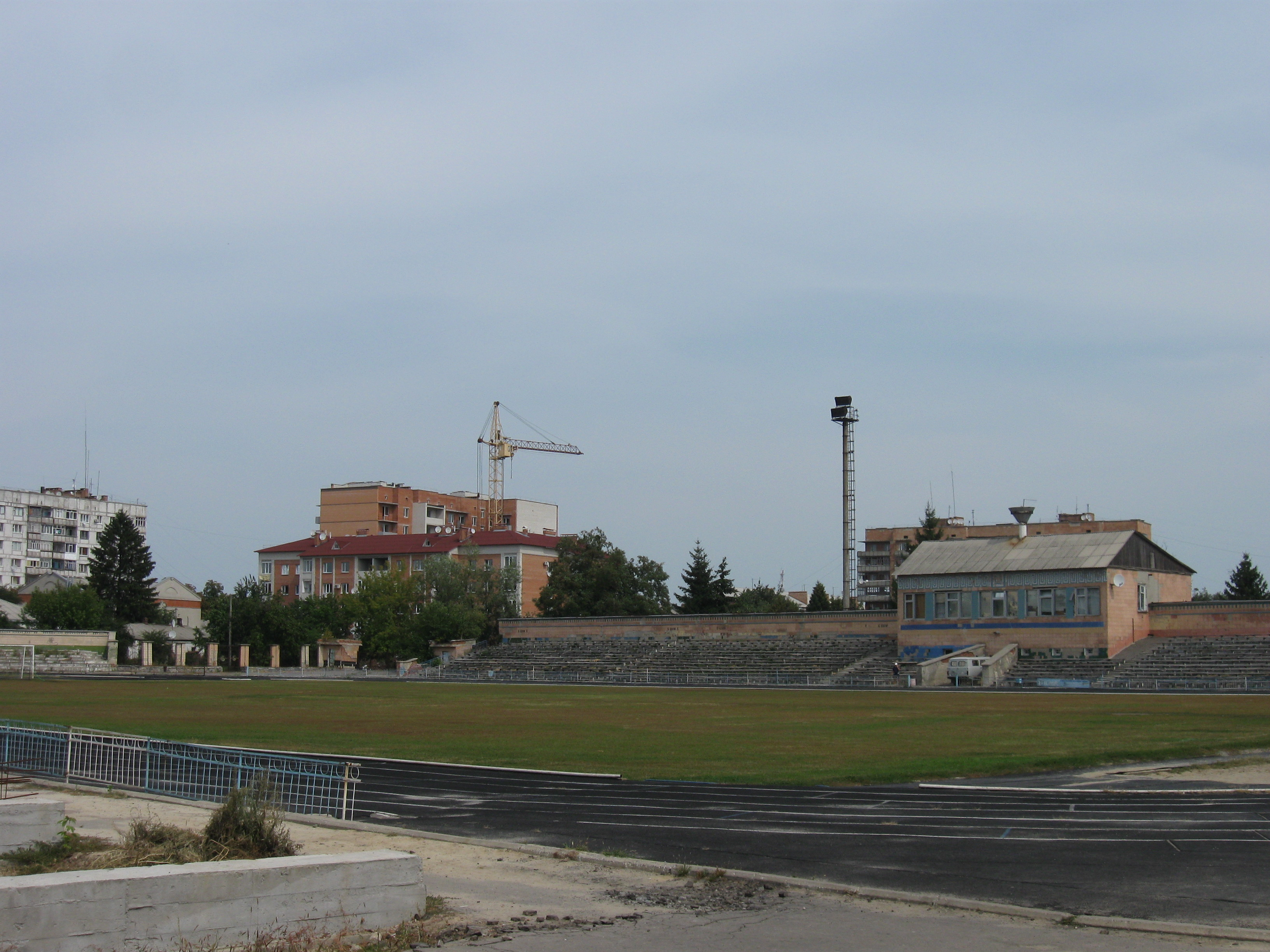
City stadium

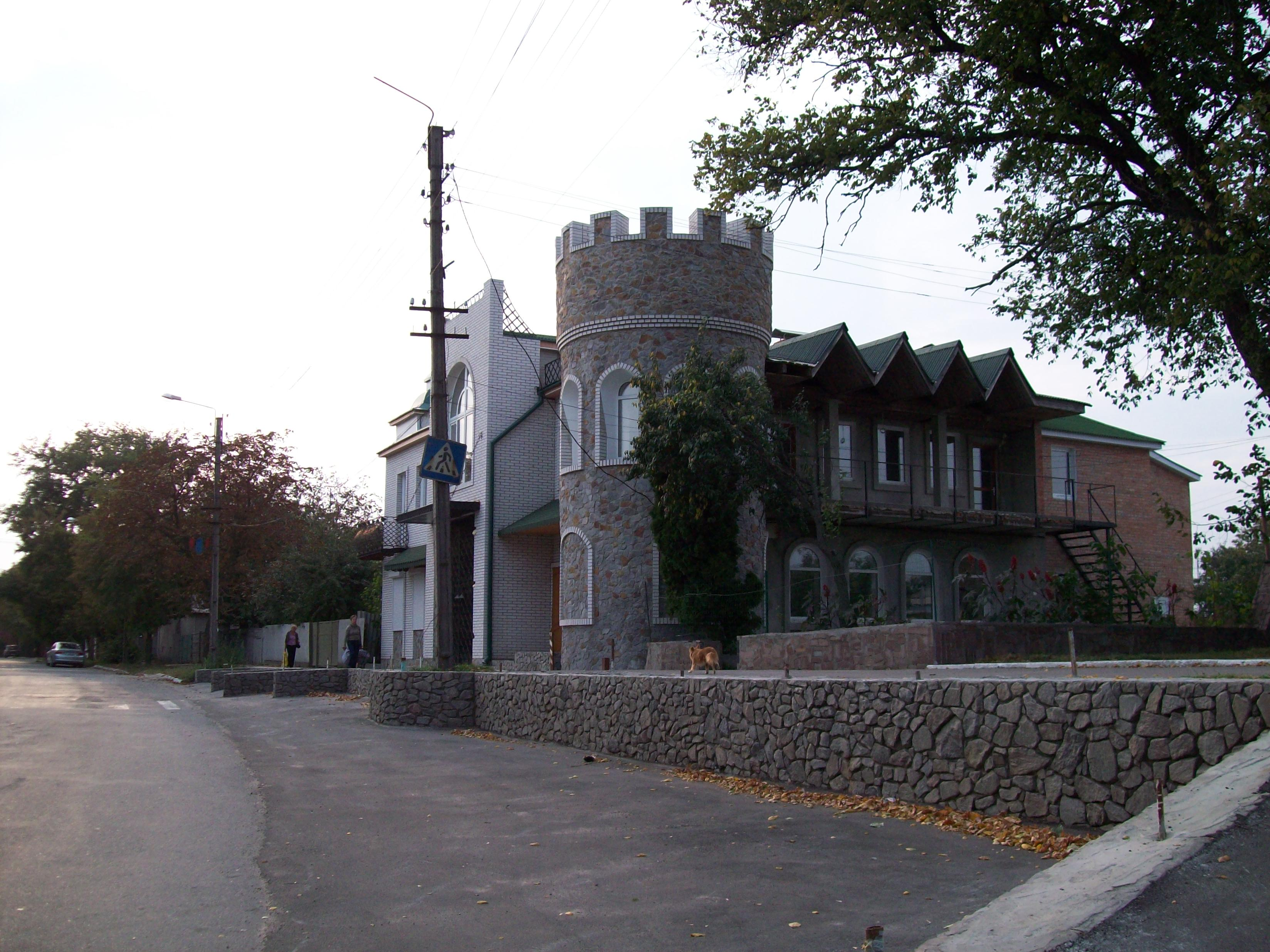
Khorol descent

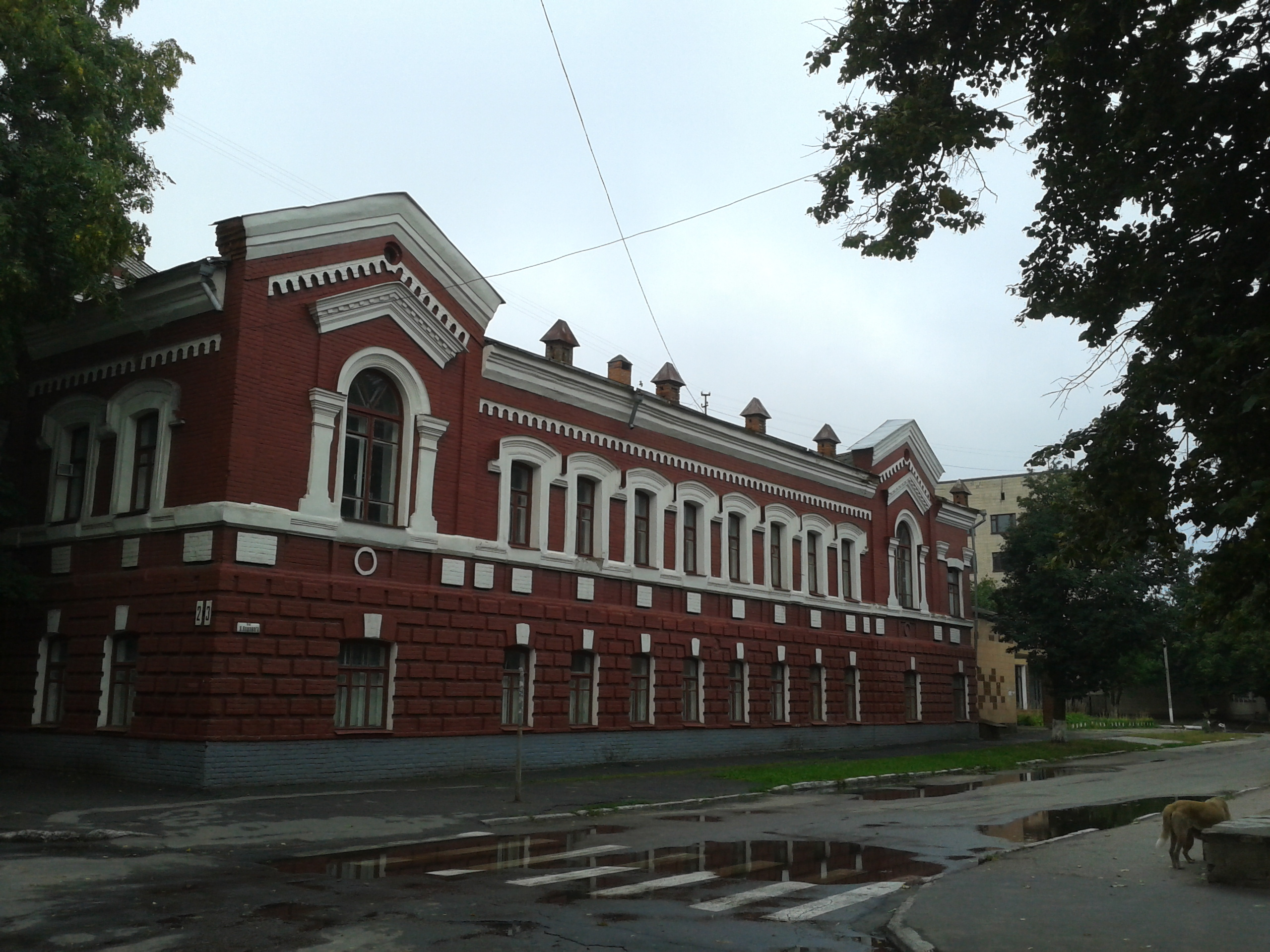
Lubny Economic college

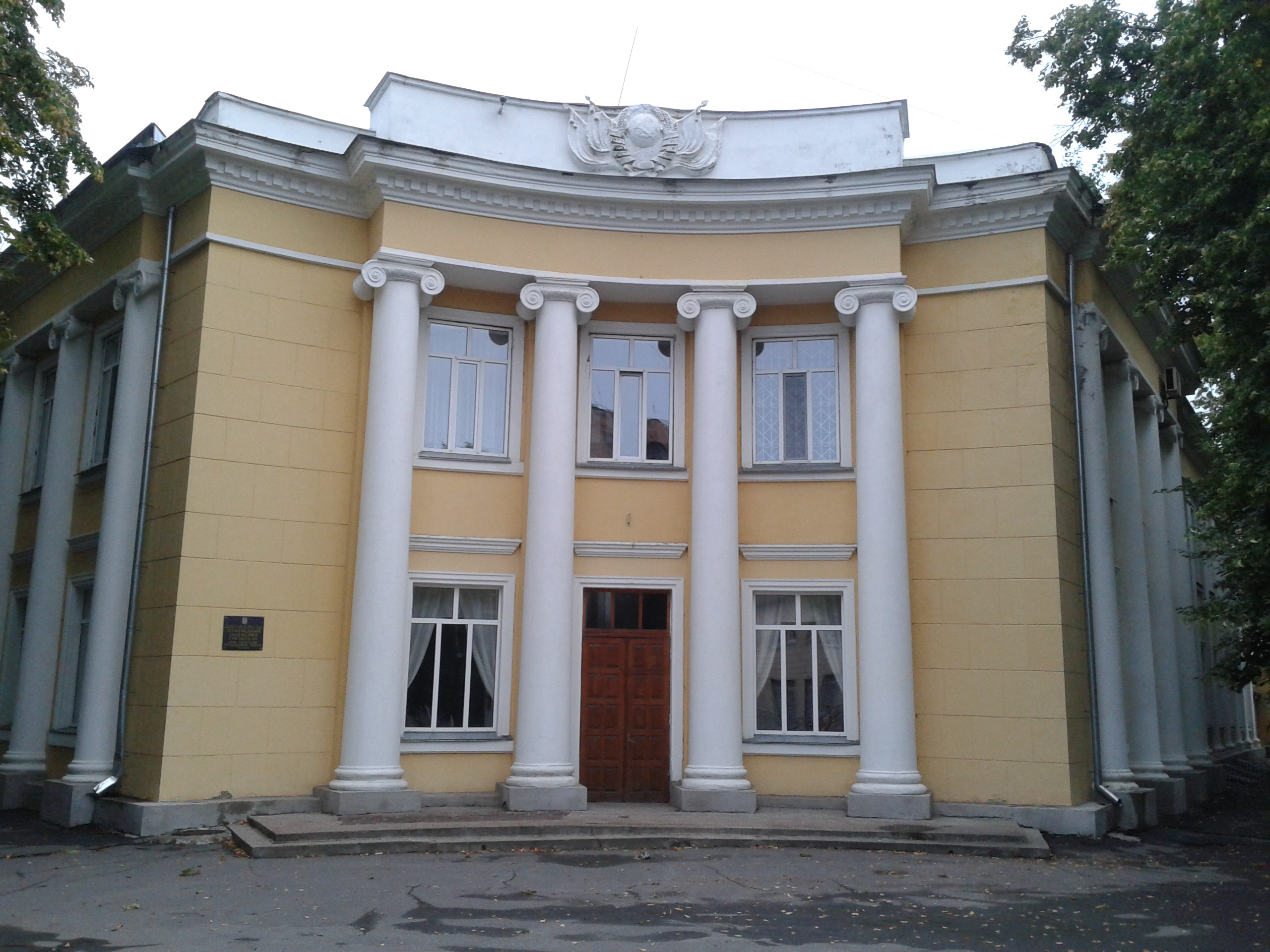
Veterans' hospital

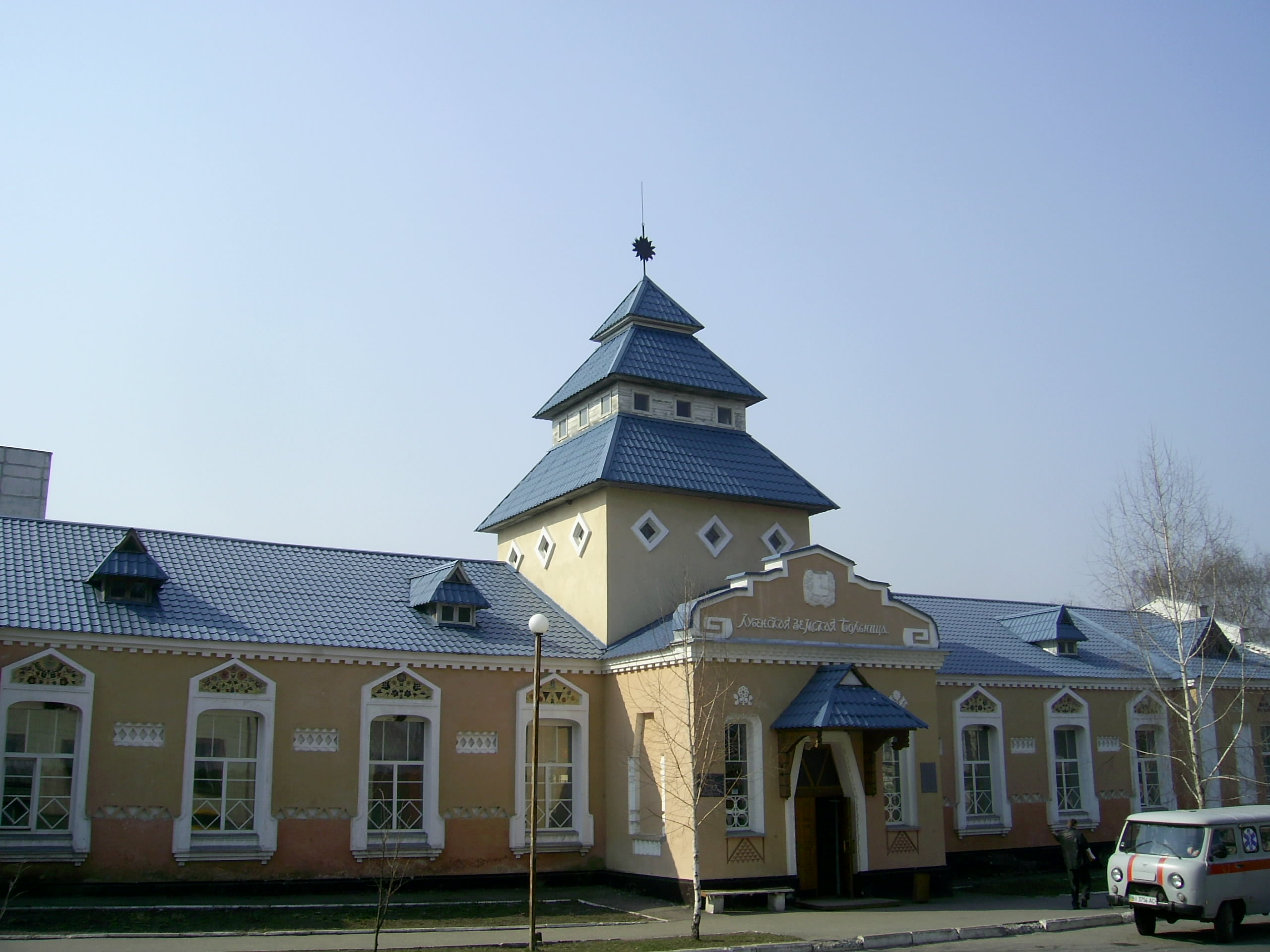
Children's clinic in Lubny

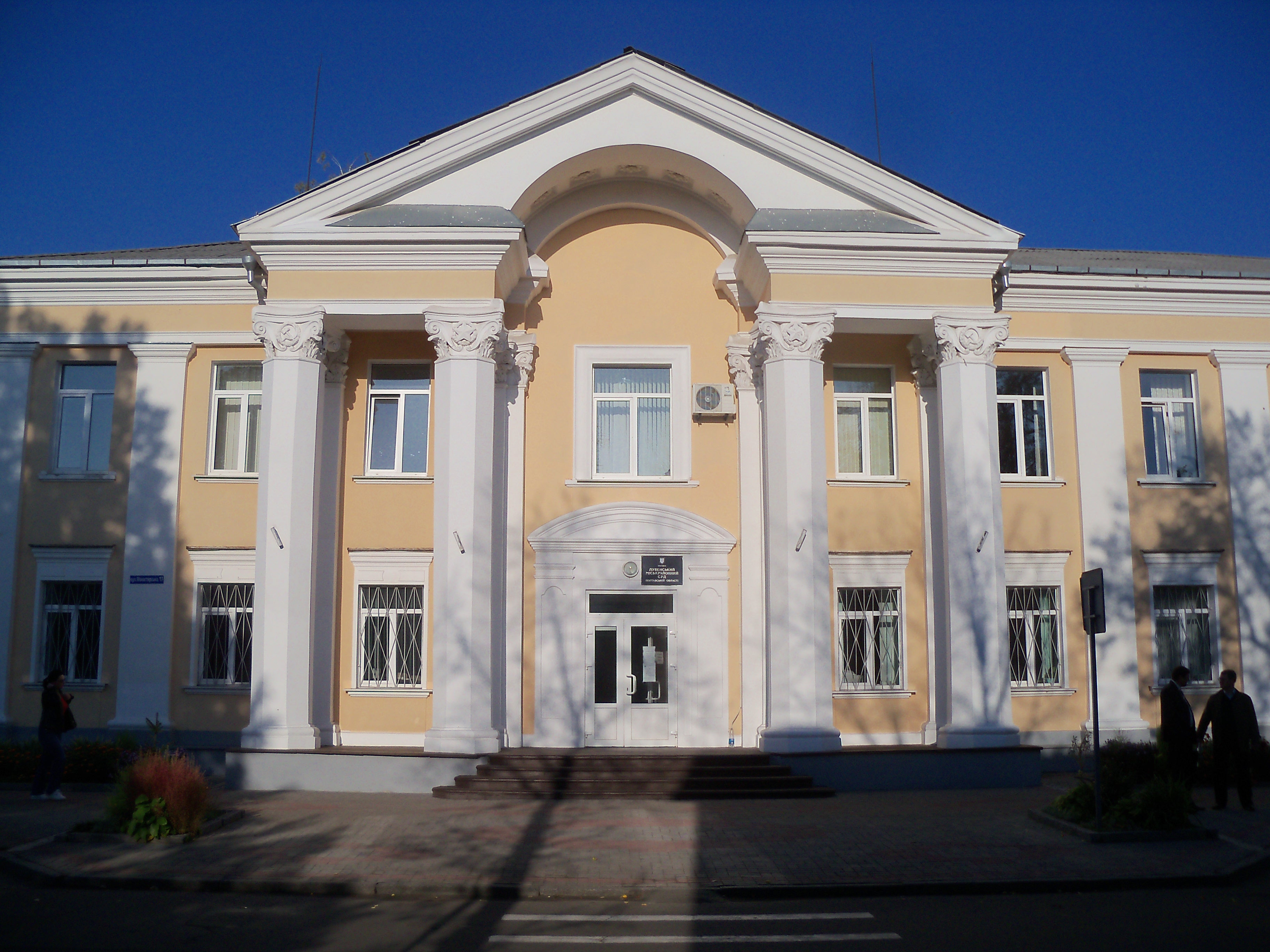
City court

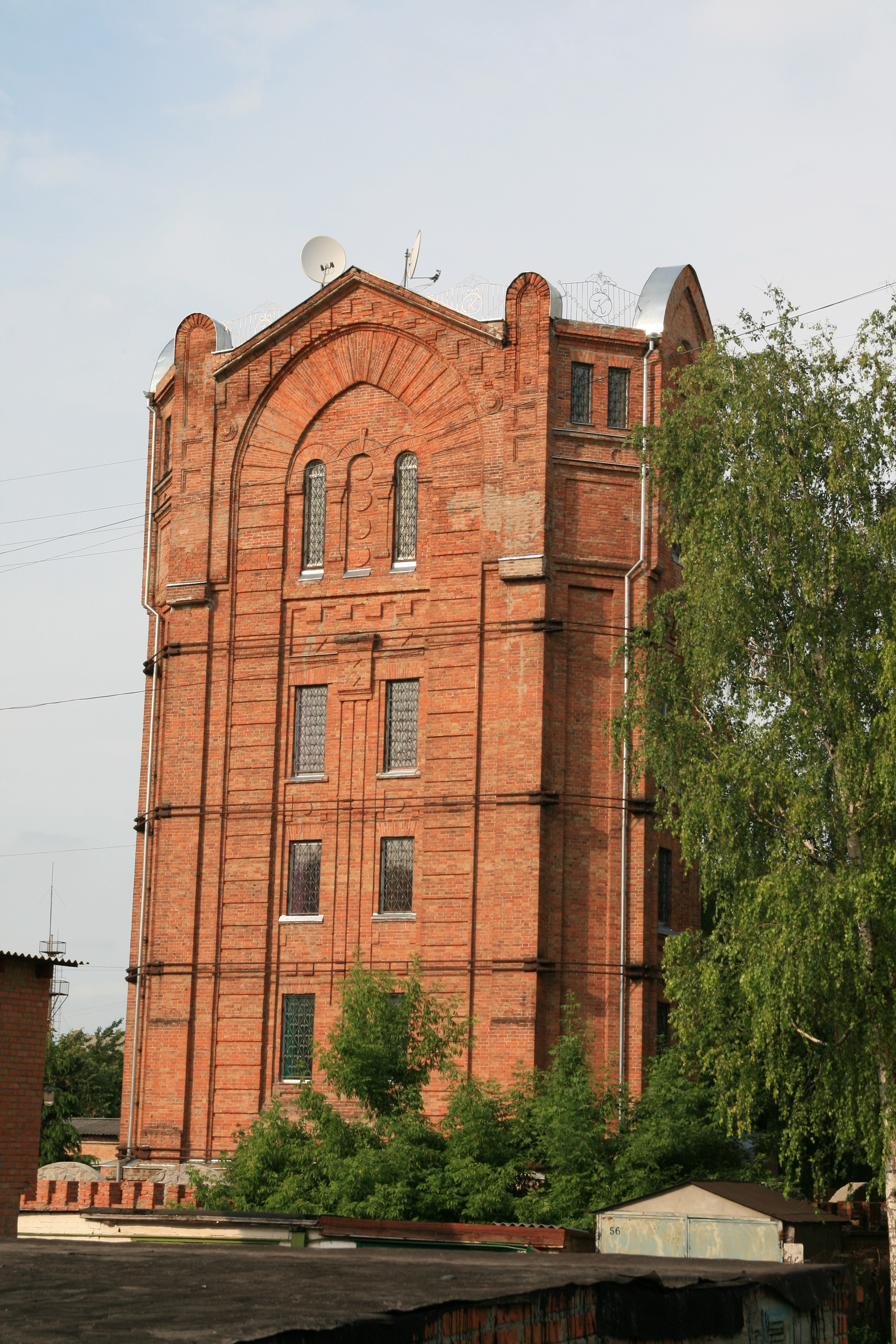
Old tower in Lubny

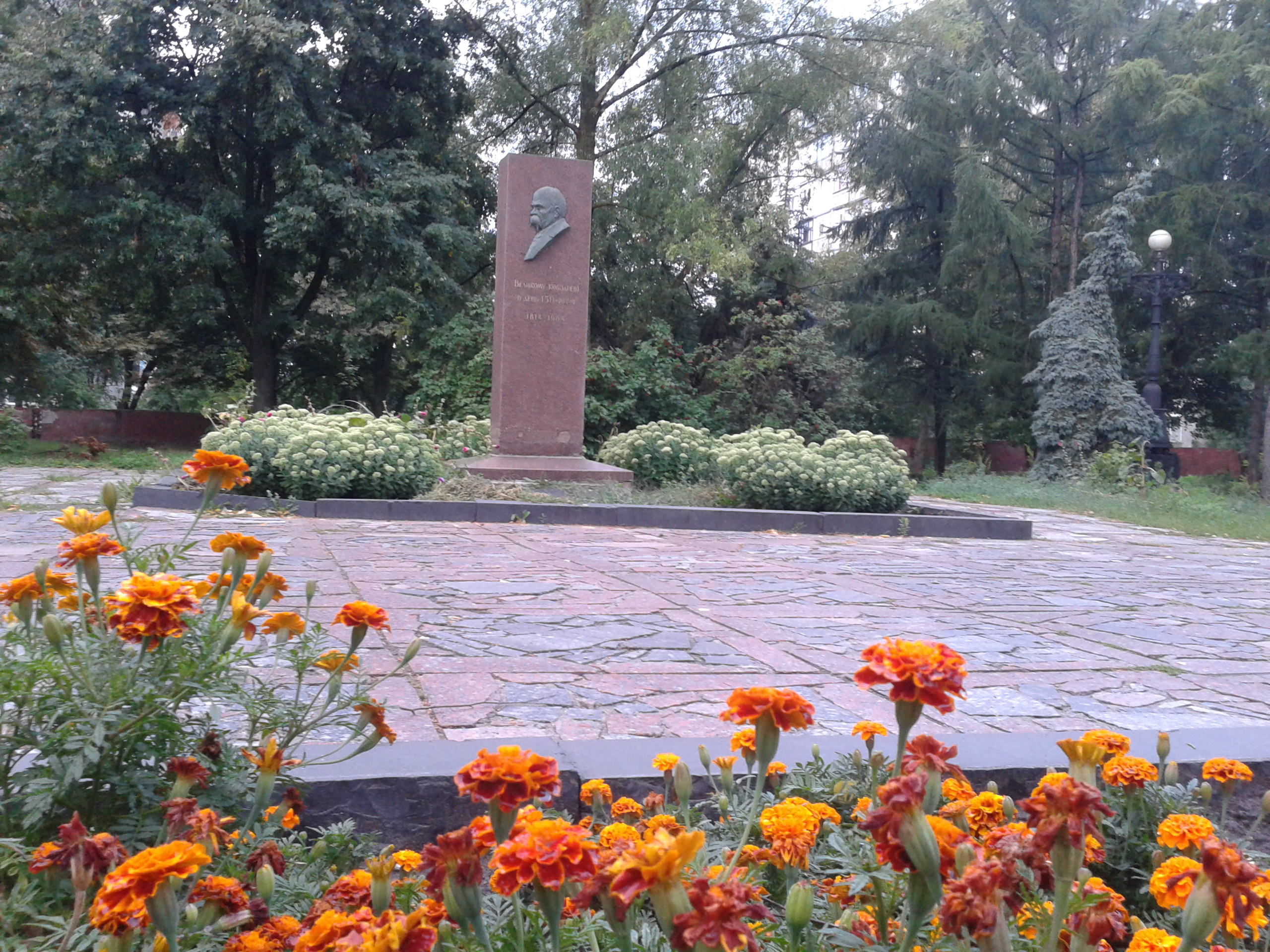
Taras Shevchenko monument

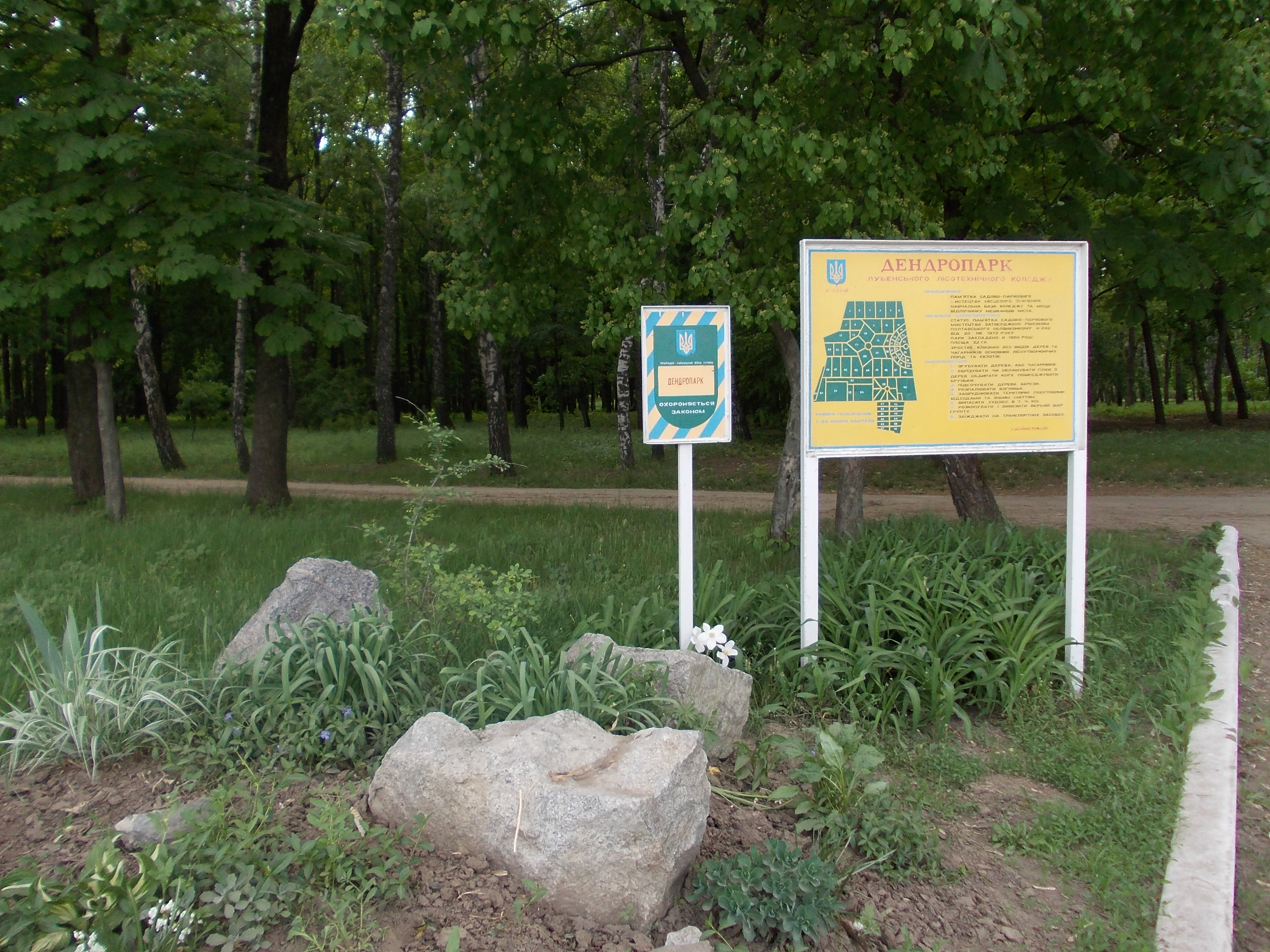
Lubny Forestry College park

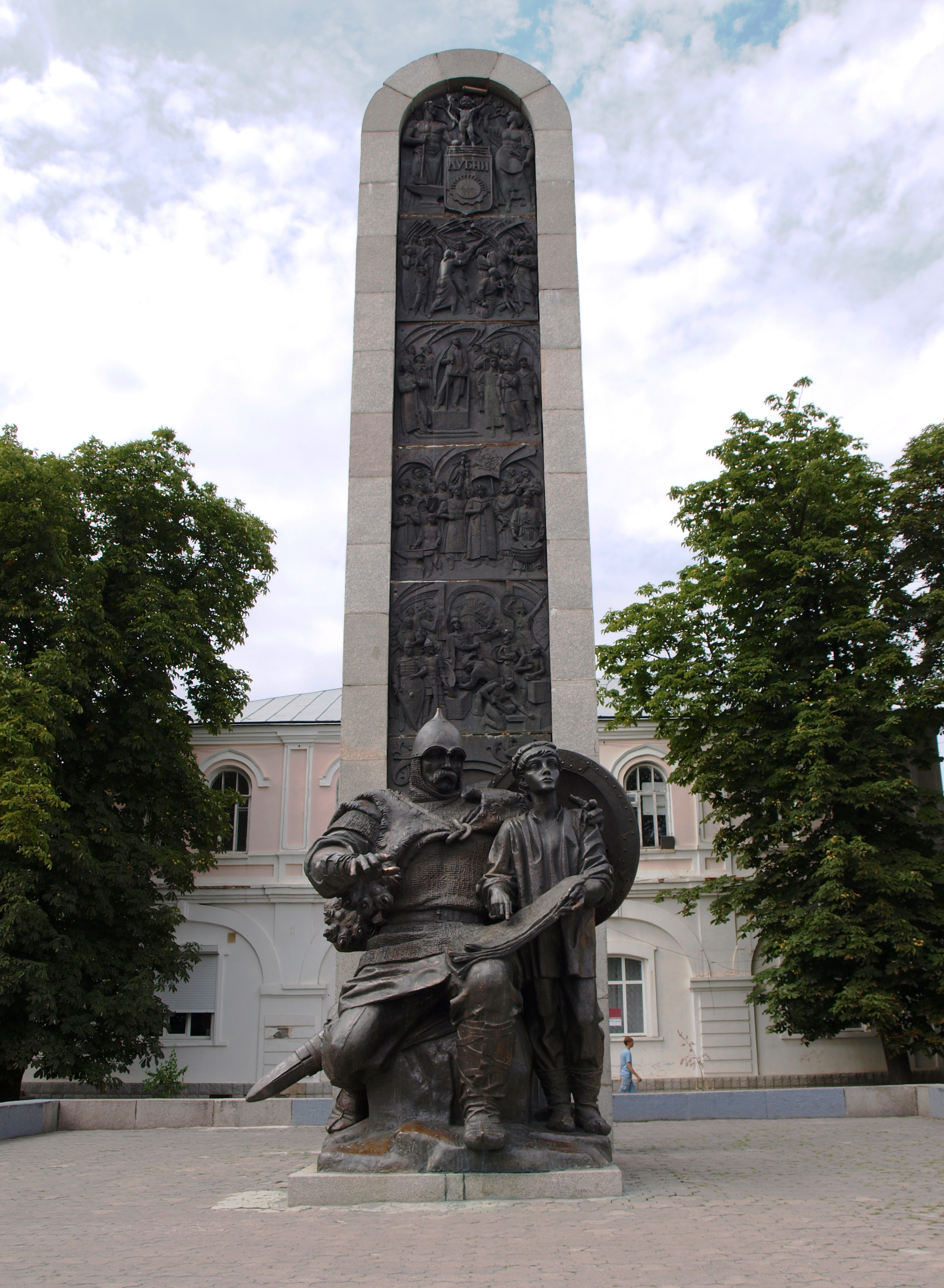
Monument to the 1000-year anniversary of Lubny

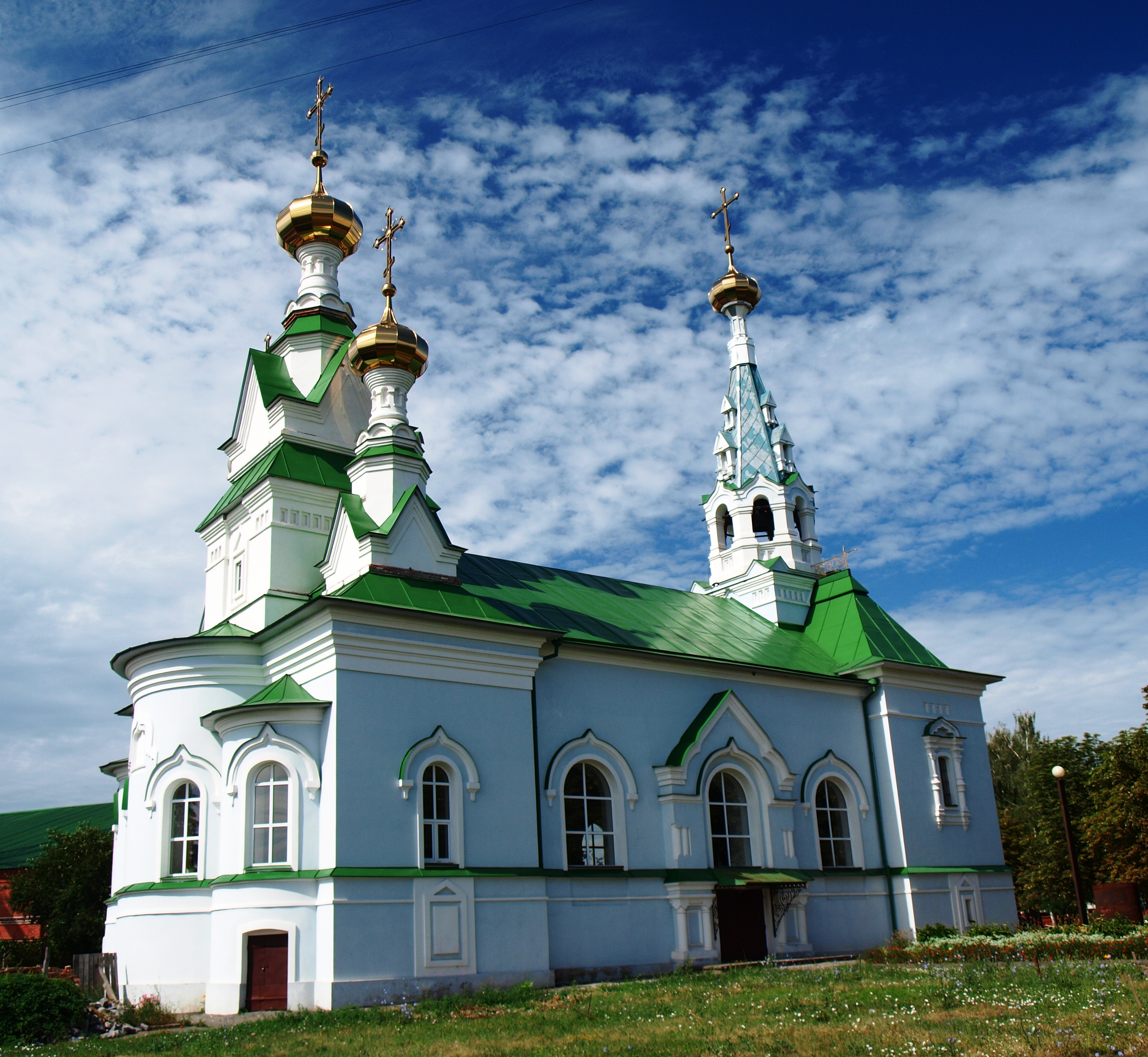
The church of the Nativity of Virgin Mary (19th century)

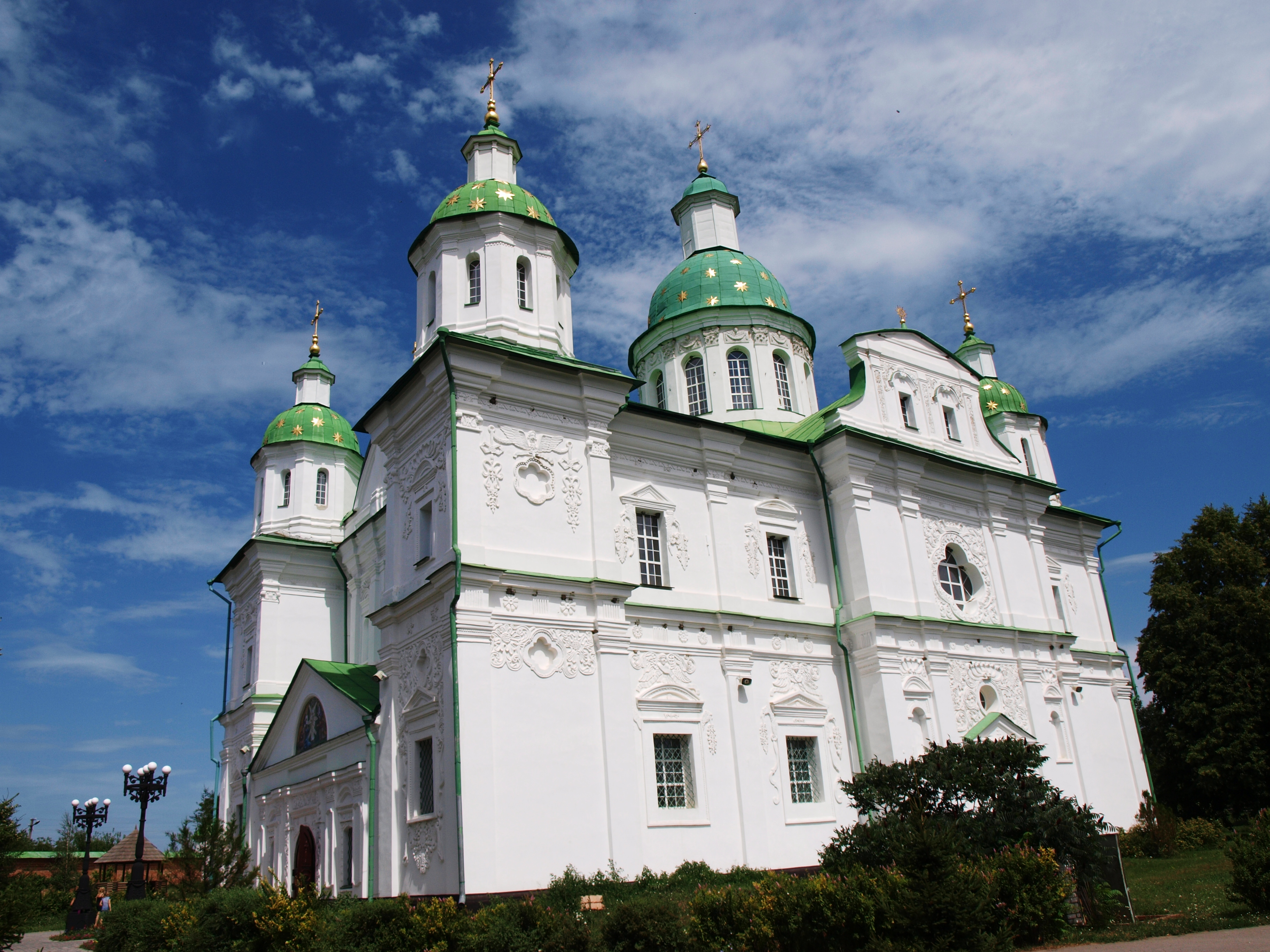
Cathedral of the Mhar Monastery (17th century)

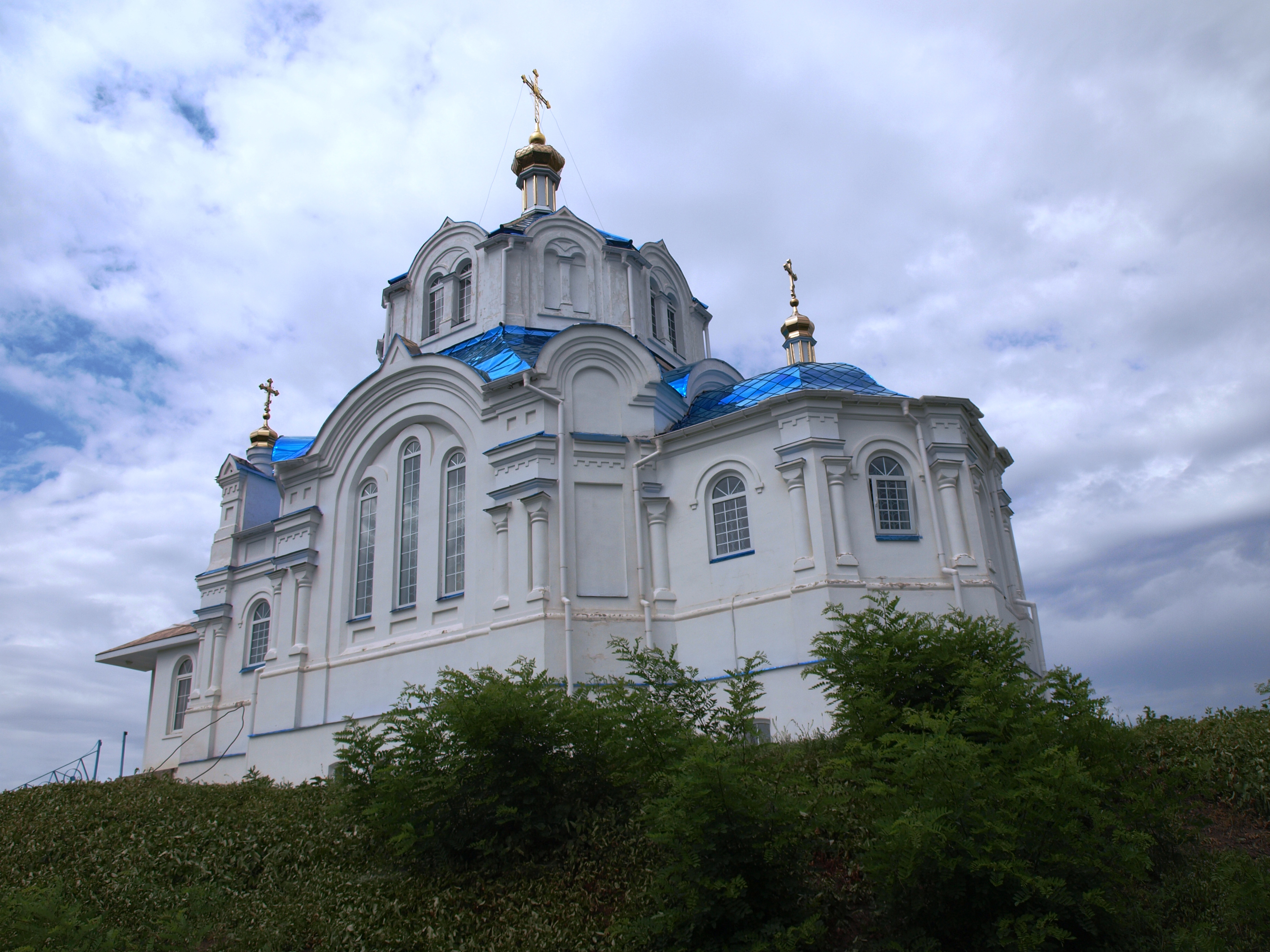
Church of the Mhar Monastery

== Transport ==
Lubny railway station is located in the city.

== Administrative divisions ==
Lubny is divided into eight microdistricts, each raion is governed by a specially-appointed secretary, and has its own branch of the police force. The secretaries are responsible for handling issues in their raion.

== Population ==
As of the only official census conducted in post-Soviet Ukraine in 2001, Lubny had a population of 52,215 inhabitants.

=== Ethnicity ===
Distribution of the population by ethnicity according to the 2001 census:

Ethnic groups in Lubny
	percent
Ukrainians	90.78%
Russians	8.15%
Belarusians	0.34%
Jews	0.10%
others	0.63%

=== Language ===
Distribution of the population by native language according to the 2001 census:

Language	Percentage
Ukrainian	91.06%
Russian	8.61%
other/undecided	0.33%

== Geography ==
=== Climate ===
Climate data for Lubny (1991–2020)
Month	Jan	Feb	Mar	Apr	May	Jun	Jul	Aug	Sep	Oct	Nov	Dec	Year
Mean daily maximum °C (°F)	−1.7 (28.9)	−0.2 (31.6)	5.7 (42.3)	14.9 (58.8)	21.4 (70.5)	24.9 (76.8)	26.8 (80.2)	26.3 (79.3)	20.1 (68.2)	12.6 (54.7)	4.7 (40.5)	−0.2 (31.6)	13.0 (55.4)
Daily mean °C (°F)	−4.1 (24.6)	−3.3 (26.1)	1.8 (35.2)	9.8 (49.6)	15.8 (60.4)	19.5 (67.1)	21.3 (70.3)	20.3 (68.5)	14.7 (58.5)	8.2 (46.8)	2.0 (35.6)	−2.5 (27.5)	8.6 (47.5)
Mean daily minimum °C (°F)	−6.4 (20.5)	−5.9 (21.4)	−1.6 (29.1)	5.1 (41.2)	10.3 (50.5)	14.3 (57.7)	16.2 (61.2)	15.0 (59.0)	10.0 (50.0)	4.4 (39.9)	−0.3 (31.5)	−4.6 (23.7)	4.7 (40.5)
Average precipitation mm (inches)	47 (1.9)	41 (1.6)	49 (1.9)	37 (1.5)	59 (2.3)	75 (3.0)	63 (2.5)	47 (1.9)	57 (2.2)	47 (1.9)	45 (1.8)	51 (2.0)	618 (24.3)
Average precipitation days (≥ 1.0 mm)	10.0	8.9	9.6	6.8	9.0	8.4	8.0	5.1	6.7	6.8	7.7	9.4	96.4
Average relative humidity (%)	86.3	82.6	75.5	63.2	63.4	65.7	67.2	65.4	71.3	78.7	86.1	87.8	74.4
Source: NOAA

== Notable people ==
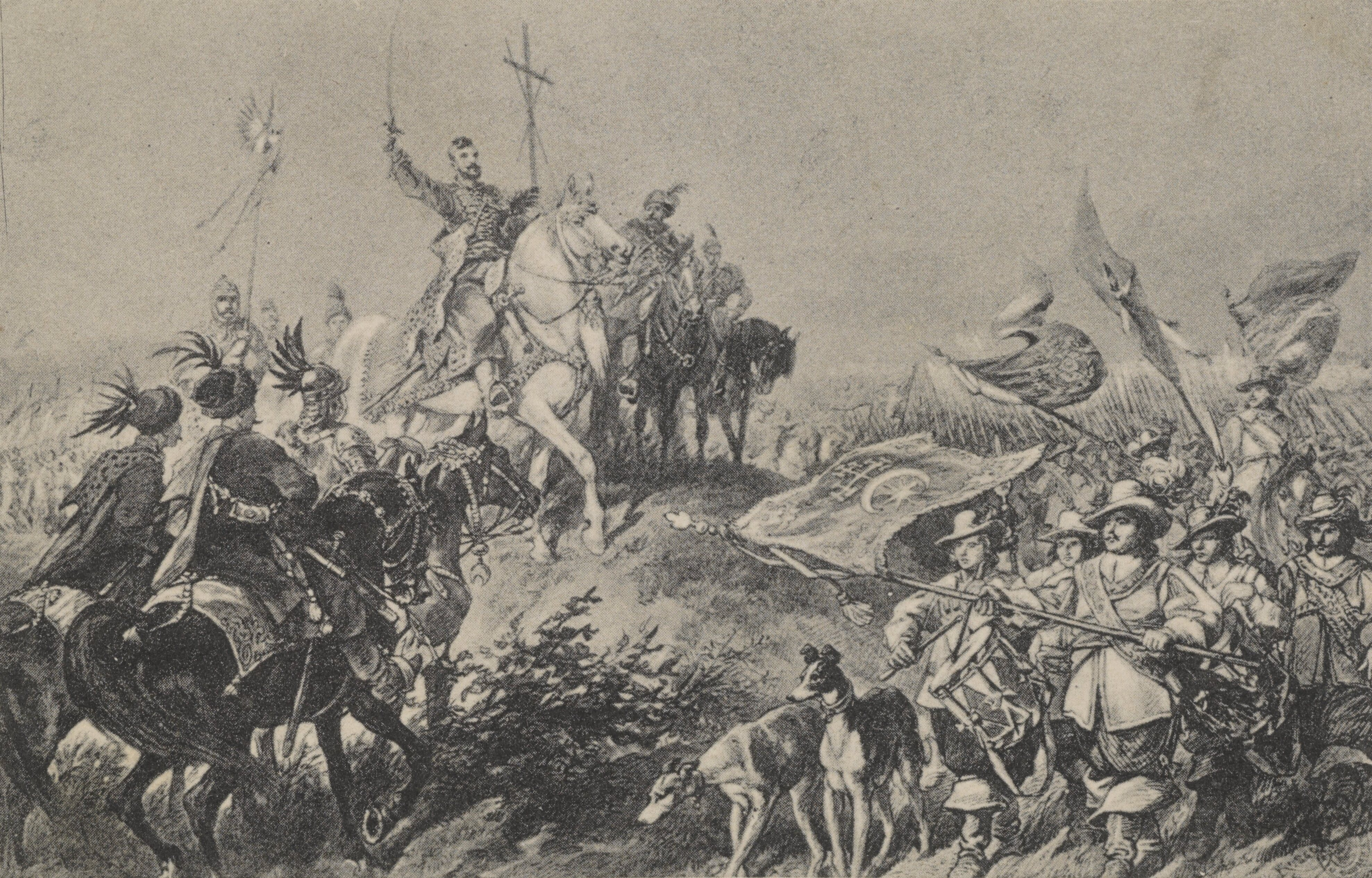
Prince Jeremi Wiśniowiecki in Lubny in 1648, by Juliusz Kossak

- Jeremi Wiśniowiecki, Ruthenian and Polish magnate, the father of the future king of Poland Michael I (1612-1651)
- Melkhisedek (Znachko-Yavorsky), 18th-century Ukrainian religious figure
- Szymon Syrski, Polish zoologist (1824–1882)
- Kateryna Skarzhynska, Ukrainian philanthropist and collector of folklore (1852-1932)
- Alexander Schlichter, Bolshevik revolutionary (1868-1940)
- Mykola Porsh, Ukrainian diplomat and politician (1879-1944)
- Lyudmila Rudenko, Soviet chess world champion (1904–1986)
- Natalya Meklin, Soviet pilot (1922-2005)
