= American cuisine =

Food culture of the United States

American cuisine encompasses the cooking style and range of dishes prepared in the United States. It primarily derives from a mixing of European cuisine, Native American and Alaskan cuisine, and African American cuisine known as soul food. The Northeast, Midwest, Mid-Atlantic, South, West, Southwest, and insular areas all have distinctive elements, reflecting native food resources, local demographics, and culinary innovation. These developments have also given some states and cities distinctive elements. Hawaiian cuisine reflects substantial influence from its native Polynesian cuisine and from East Asian cuisine, while Louisiana Creole integrates elements from French, West African, and Native American cuisines. Proximity and territorial expansion have also led to substantial influence from Latin American cuisine, including new forms such as Tex-Mex and New Mexican cuisine. Native American cuisines such as Tlingit cuisine have persisted.

Modern mass media and global immigration have brought influences from many other cultures, and some elements of American food culture have become global exports. Some traditions are regional heritages associated with a particular ethnic group, including Cajun and Pennsylvania Dutch. Several states have unique cuisines, such as Minnesotan cuisine and California cuisine. Some immigrant groups have had their cuisines evolve, resulting in a distinct tradition, such as Chinese American, German American, Irish American, Italian American, Greek American, Jewish American and Mexican American.

American cooking dates back to the traditions of the Native Americans, whose diet included a mix of farmed and hunted food, and varied widely across the continent. The Colonial period created a mix of New World and Old World cookery and brought new crops and livestock. During the early 19th century, cooking was based mostly on what the agrarian population could grow, hunt, or raise on their land. With an increasing influx of immigrants and a move to city life, American food further diversified in the latter part of the 19th century. The 20th century saw a revolution in cooking as new technologies, the World Wars, a scientific understanding of food, and continued immigration combined to create a wide range of new foods. This has allowed for the rich diversity of dishes throughout the country. The popularity of the automobile in the 20th century also influenced American eating habits in the form of drive-in and drive-through restaurants.

American cuisine includes milkshakes, barbecue, and a wide range of fried foods. Many quintessential American dishes are unique takes on foods originally from other culinary traditions, including burgers, pizza, hot dogs, and Tex-Mex. Regional cooking includes a range of fish dishes in the coastal states, gumbo, and various sandwiches i.e. Peanut Butter Jelly, cheesesteak. American cuisine has specific foods that are eaten on holidays, such as a turkey at Thanksgiving dinner or Christmas dinner. Modern American cuisine includes a focus on fast food and take-out food, often of ethnic origin. The culinary scene in the country is shaped by televised celebrity chefs, social media, and foodie culture.

== History ==
=== Native American origins: American cuisine before 1600 ===
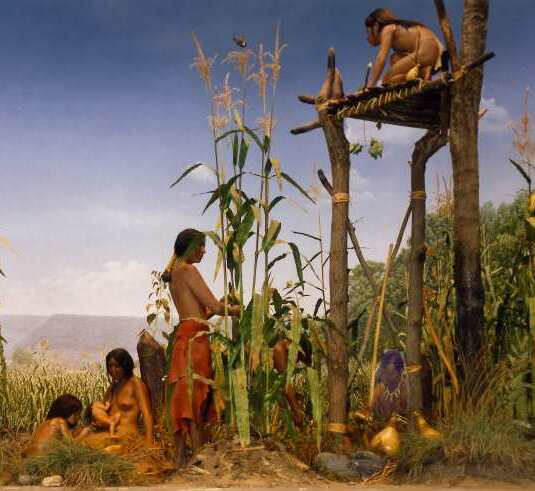
Diorama of Iroquois planting the "Three Sister" crops; squash, maize and climbing beans

Native Americans used many cooking methods in early American cuisine that were blended with those of early Europeans, forming the basis of what is now American cuisine. Nearly all regions and subregions of the present-day cuisine have roots in the foodways of Native Americans, who lived in tribes numbering in the thousands. Before 1600, native peoples lived off the land across very diverse bioregions and had done so for thousands of years, often leading a nomadic life in which their diet changed with the seasons.

Many practiced a form of agriculture revolving around the Three Sisters, the rotation of beans, maize, and squash as staples of their diet. In the East, this was documented as early as the 1620s in Of Plimoth Plantation, evidenced by the pages William Bradford wrote regarding Squanto, who showed them the traditional regional method of burying a fish or eel in a mound with seeds for maize to improve the soil; this itself is also part of the widely practiced phenomenon of companion planting.

Wild game was equally a staple of nearly every tribe: generally, deer, elk, and bison were staples, as were rabbits and hares. The Cherokee of the Southern Appalachians used blowguns made of an indigenous type of bamboo to hunt squirrels.

Northern tribes like the Ojibwe of what is now the state of Michigan and the peoples of the Wabanaki of what is now the state of Maine would stalk and hunt moose, whereas their Southern counterparts, like the Choctaw or Catawba, hunted snapping turtles and other testudines, possums, and young alligators in the subtropical swamps of Louisiana and South Carolina.

Many tribes would preserve their meat as pemmican, which was needed on long journeys or to survive harsh winters.

==== Fish and crustaceans ====
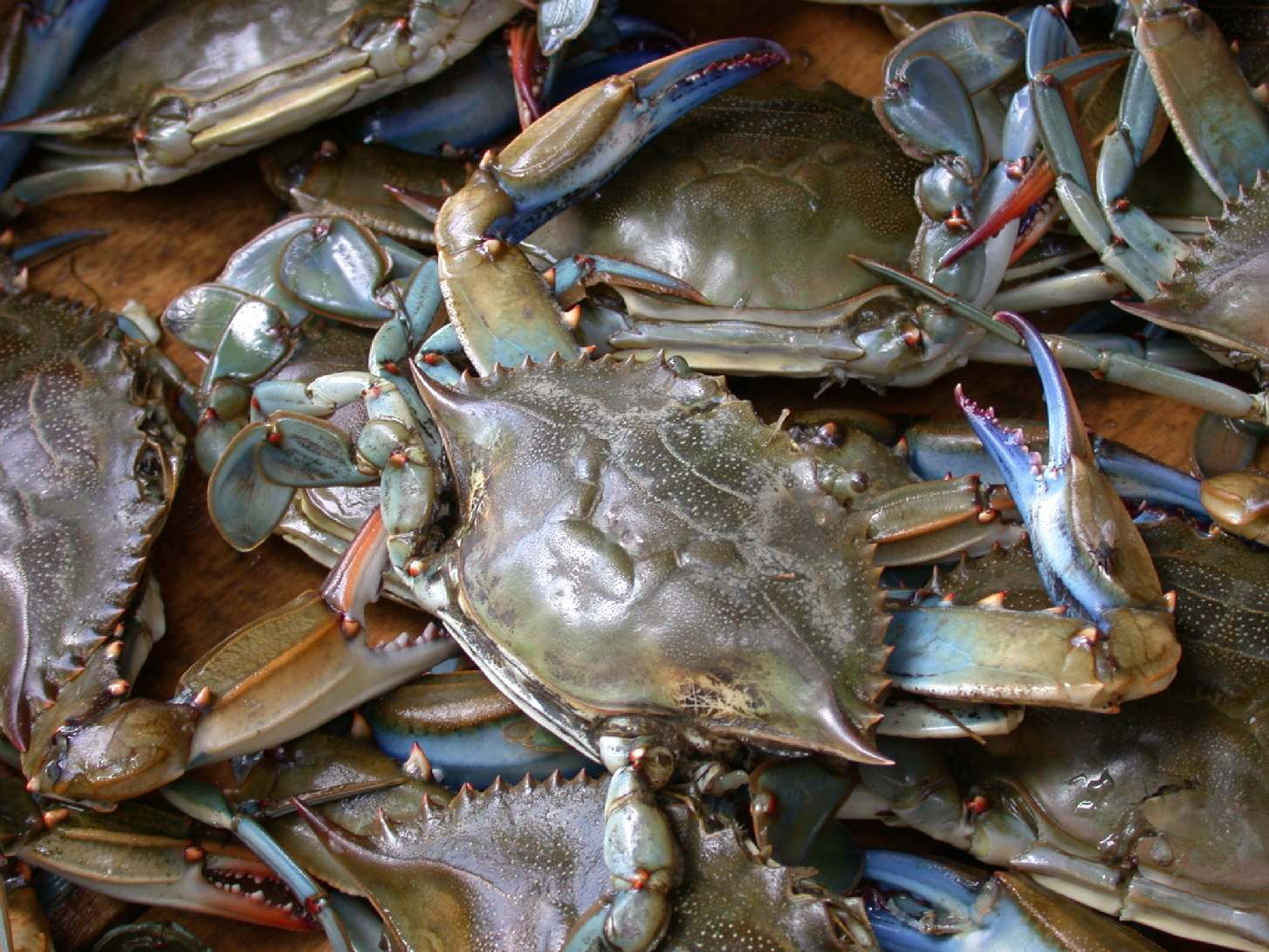
Blue crab was used on the eastern and southern coast of what is now the U.S. mainland.

As with the hunted game, the biome in which one lived often dictated what was available to catch. For example, the Apache and Navajo peoples of the Southwest, whose territories each would have included swathes of New Mexico and Arizona, generally do not eat fish because in both cultures it is taboo, as well as often inconvenient. The Navajo believe that fish have a part in the story of creation, the Apache were in general afraid of water since they associated it with thunder, and the arid desert climate made fish a rarity.

However, in the culture of the Lenape, the tribe that originally lived in New Jersey, on the Delaware River, and the area that now comprises New York City, fish and shellfish were a staple in their diet; it was such a revered part of the culture that there is a documented and still-practiced harvest dance called the Fish Dance. Originally it would have been done to celebrate bringing in fish from places like the Delaware or Raritan River or the estuary around Manhattan Island and the completion of smoking them as a source of food for the winter ahead.

Eastern tribes would have eaten cod, particularly groups that spoke the Algonquian languages of New England as far south as present day Connecticut, winter flounder and other flatfish, species of herring like the alewife, shad, Atlantic herring, and Atlantic menhaden, They also would have consumed the Atlantic sturgeon and drum.

In the West, Pacific several species of sturgeon, like the white sturgeon and green sturgeon, eulachon and several autochthonal fish of the Oncorhynchus family including the rainbow trout, cutthroat trout, coho salmon, kokanee salmon, and chinook salmon. The last makes an appearance in the accounts of Lewis and Clark as being fished for in the Columbia River Basin, and this species is named for a family of tribes of the Pacific Northwest, indicating its important role in that food culture.

Pacific gray whales and humpbacks were hunted by American Indians off the Northwest coast, especially by the Makah, and used for their meat and oil. Catfish was also popular among native people throughout the land, over many types of terrain.

Crustaceans included shrimp, crayfish, and dungeness crabs in the Northwest and shrimp, lobster and blue crabs in the East. Other shellfish include abalone and geoduck on the West Coast, and on the East Coast, the surf clam, quahog, and soft-shell clam. Oysters, mussels, and periwinkles were eaten on both shores.

==== Cooking methods ====
Early American natives used many cooking methods that were blended with early European methods to form the basis of American cuisine. Grilling meat was common. Spit roasting over a pit fire was common as well. Vegetables, especially root vegetables, were often cooked directly in the ashes of the fire.

As early Native Americans lacked pottery that could be used directly over a fire, they developed a technique many anthropologists call "stone boiling". They heated rocks in a fire, then added them to a pot of water until it came to a boil to cook the meat or vegetables. In what is now the Southwestern United States, they also created adobe ovens, dubbed hornos by the Spanish, to bake products such as cornmeal bread. Other parts of America dug pit ovens, which were also used to steam foods by adding heated rocks or embers. One technique performed extensively by New England tribes was adding seaweed or corn husks on top of the layers of stones to steam fish and shellfish as well as vegetables. A later addition was potatoes, a garden plant that came to New England by the 18th century, added while still in skin with corn in husk, later to be referred to as a clambake by colonists.

=== Colonial period ===
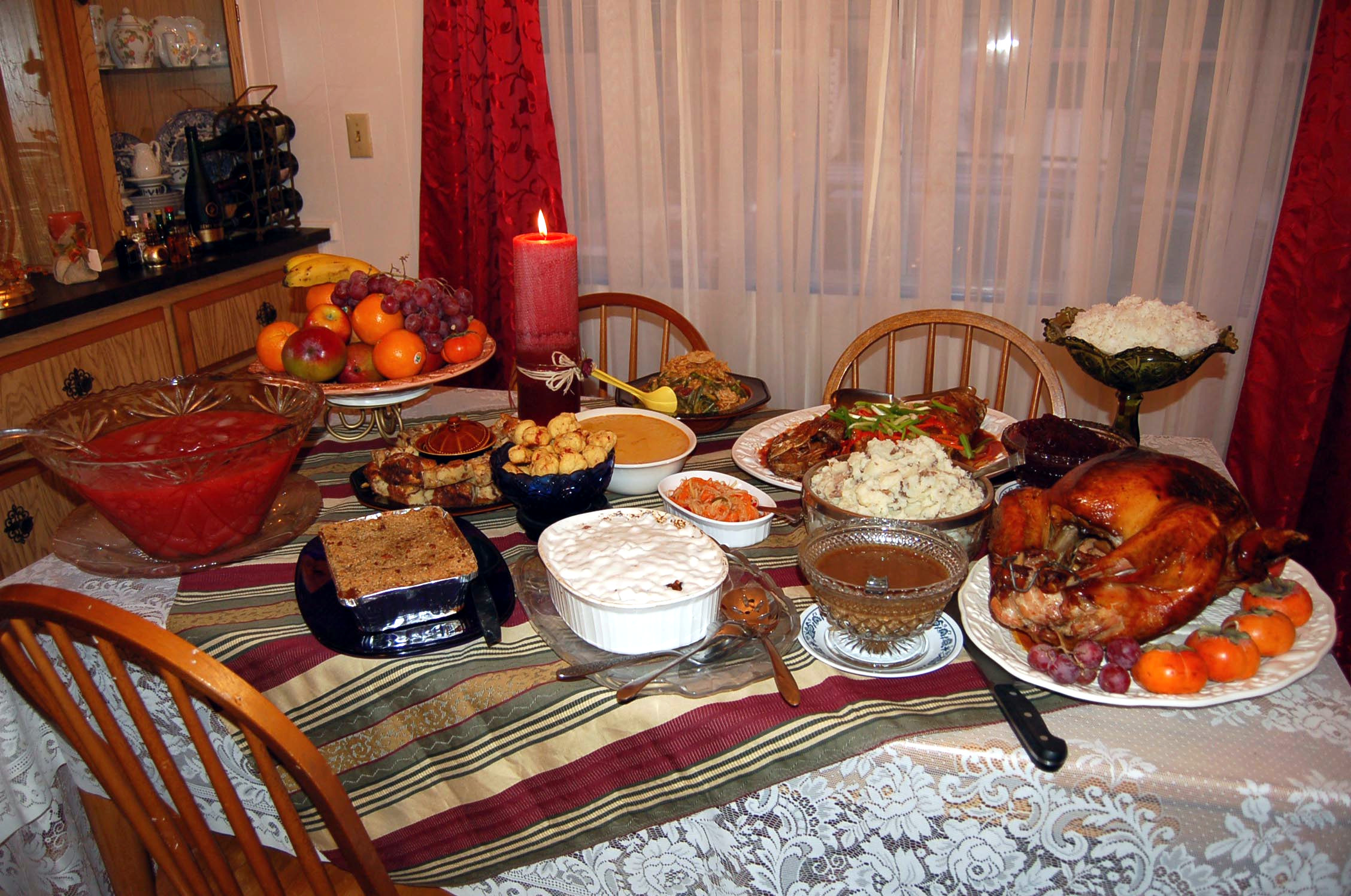
Roast turkey with gravy, cranberry sauce, mashed potatoes, green beans, sweet and sour cod, steamed rice, achara (pickled green papaya relish), leche flan, pig in a blanket and apple crisp

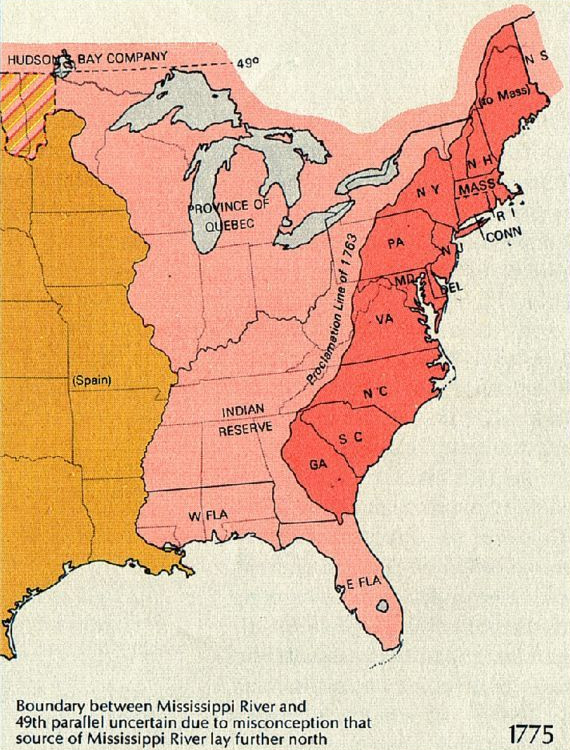
Map of the 13 American Colonies in 1775

The European settlement of the Americas introduced several ingredients, spices, herbs, and cooking styles to the continent.

When European colonists came to Virginia, Pennsylvania, Massachusetts, and any of the other English colonies on the eastern seaboard of North America, their initial attempts at survival included planting crops familiar to them from back home in England. In the same way, they farmed animals for clothing and meat. Through hardships and the eventual establishment of trade with England, the West Indies and other regions, the colonists were able to derive a cuisine similar to what they had previously consumed in Britain and Ireland, while also introducing local animals and plants to their diet.

In 1796, the first American cookbook American Cookery was published; others followed. There was a general disdain for French cuisine/French cookery, even with French Huguenot settlers in South Carolina and French-Canadian emigrants in America. One of the cookbooks that proliferated in the colonies was the English cookbook The Art of Cookery Made Plain and Easy (1747) by Hannah Glasse, who referred to "the blind folly of this age that would rather be imposed on by a French booby, than give encouragement to a good English cook!" Of the French recipes given in the text, she speaks out flagrantly against the dishes as she "... think[s] it an odd jumble of trash."

With the introduction of slavery, Africans were brought into the colonies. With them, came foods and ingredients such as bananas, peanuts, sweet potato, yams, and coffee, and cooking styles reminiscent of West African cuisines are still found in many dishes, especially in Southern cuisine.

The expulsion of the Acadians from Acadia led many of them to Louisiana, where they left a French influence on the diet of those settled in Louisiana, and among the Acadian Francophones who settled eastern Maine and parts of what is now northern Vermont at the same time they colonized New Brunswick.

Some of the Jews who fled from the Inquisition with other Sephardic Jews in the 15th century had previously settled in Recife, Brazil and the West Indies, where their cuisine was influenced by new local ingredients like molasses, rum, sugar, vanilla, chocolate, peppers, corn, tomatoes, kidney beans, string beans and turkey. In 1654, 23 Sephardic Jews arrived in New Amsterdam, bringing this cuisine to the early colonial United States. This branch of Sephardic cuisine heavily influenced early American Jewish cuisine. Many of the recipes were tied to the observance of traditional holidays and remained true to their origins. These included dishes such as stew and fish fried in olive oil, beef and bean stews, almond puddings, and egg custards. The first kosher cookbook in America was the Jewish Cookery Book by Esther Levy, published in 1871 in Philadelphia, and it includes many traditional recipes.

==== Common ingredients ====
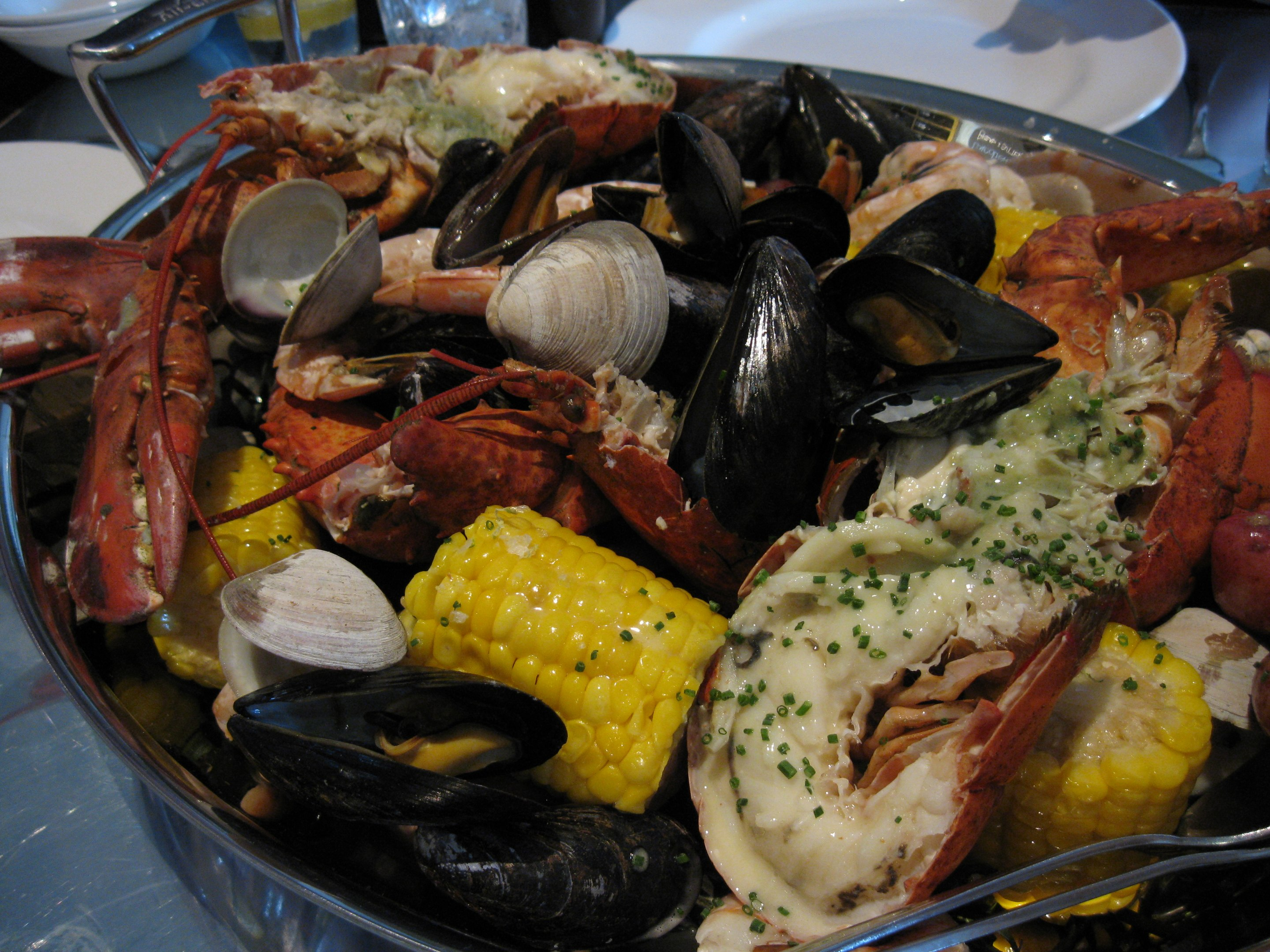
A New England clam bake consists of various steamed shellfish.

The American colonial diet varied depending on the settled region in which someone lived. Local cuisine patterns had been established by the mid-18th century. The New England colonies were extremely similar in their dietary habits to those that many of them had brought from England. As many of the New Englanders were originally from England, game hunting was useful when they immigrated to the New World. Many of the northern colonists depended on their ability to hunt or on others from whom they could purchase game. Hunting was the preferred method of protein acquisition, as opposed to animal husbandry, which required much more work to defend the kept animals against raids.

A striking difference for the colonists in New England compared to other regions was seasonality. While in the southern colonies, they could farm almost year-round, in the northern colonies, the growing seasons were very restricted. In addition, northern colonists' proximity to the ocean gave them a bounty of fresh fish to add to their diet.

Wheat, the grain used to bake bread back in England, was almost impossible to grow; imports of wheat were far from cost productive. Substitutes in cases such as this included cornmeal. The Johnnycake was a poor substitute for some for wheaten bread, but acceptance by both the northern and southern colonies seems evident.

==== Livestock and game ====
Commonly hunted game included deer, bear, buffalo, and wild turkey. The larger muscles of the animals were roasted and served with currant sauce, while the other smaller portions went into soups, stews, sausages, pies, and pastries. In addition to the game, colonists' protein intake was supplemented by mutton.

The Spanish in Florida originally introduced sheep to the New World, but this development never quite reached the North, where they were introduced by the Dutch and the English. The keeping of sheep was a result of the English non-practice of animal husbandry. The animals provided wool when young and mutton upon maturity after wool production was no longer desirable. The forage-based diet for sheep that prevailed in the Colonies produced a characteristically strong, gamy flavor and a tougher consistency, which required aging and slow cooking to tenderize.

==== Fats and oils ====
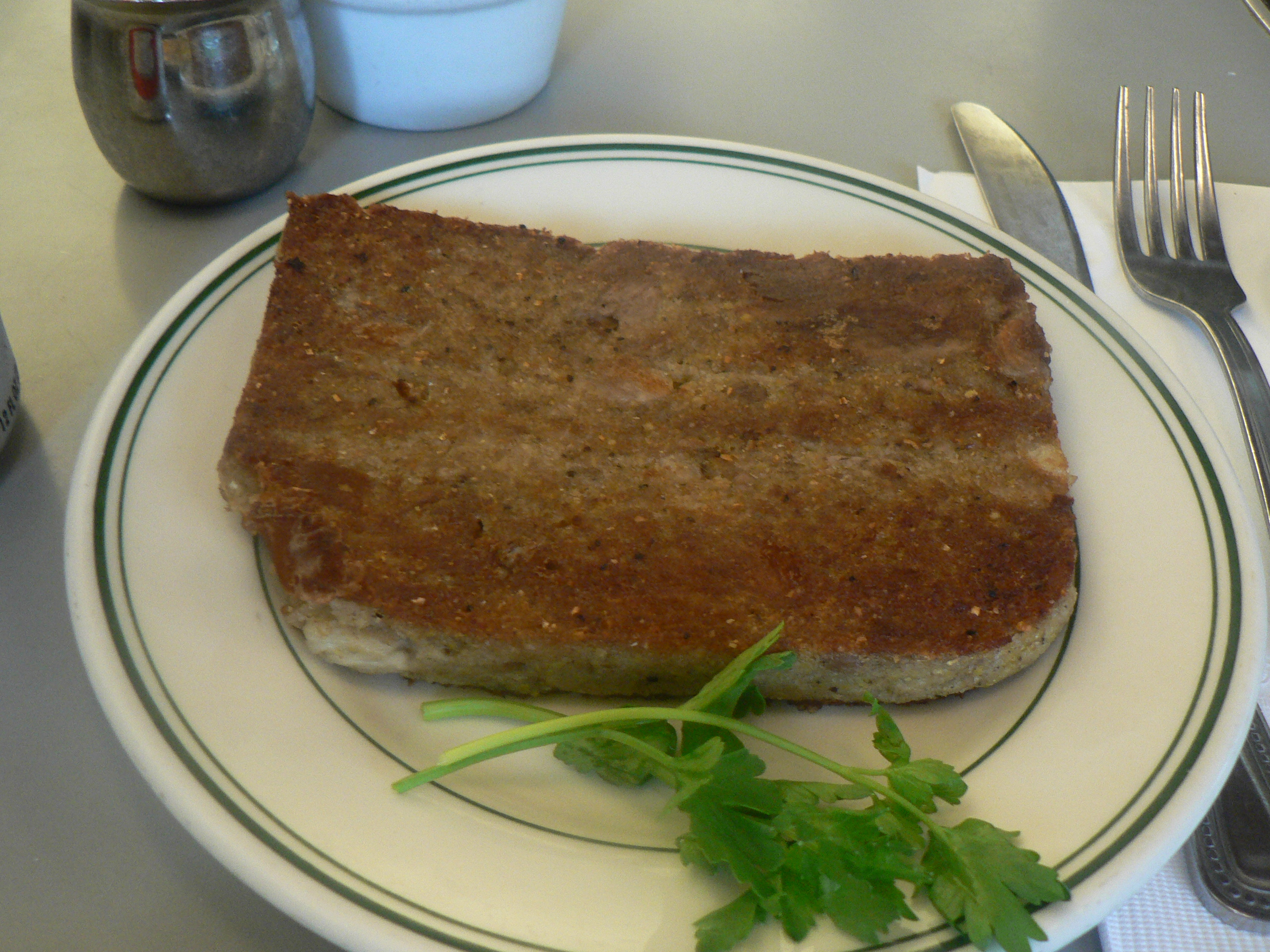
A plate of scrapple, a traditional dish of the Delaware River Valley region made of pork and cornmeal, still eaten today

Fats and oils from animals were used to cook many colonial foods. Many homes had a deerskin sack filled with bear oil for cooking, while solidified bear fat resembled shortening.

Rendered pork fat made the most popular cooking medium, especially from the cooking of bacon. Pork fat was used more often in the southern colonies than in the northern colonies, as the Spanish introduced pigs earlier to the South. The colonists enjoyed butter in cooking as well, but it was rare before the American Revolution, as cattle were not yet plentiful.

==== Alcoholic drinks ====
Before the Revolution, New Englanders consumed large quantities of rum and beer, as maritime trade provided them with relatively easy access to the goods needed to produce them. Rum was the distilled spirit of choice, as the main ingredient, molasses, was readily available from trade with the West Indies.

Further into the interior, however, one would often find colonists consuming whiskey, as they did not have similar access to sugar cane. They did have ready access to corn and rye, which they used to produce their whiskey.

Until the Revolution, many considered whiskey a coarse alcohol unfit for human consumption, as many believed it made the poor raucous, unkempt drunkards. In addition to these alcohol-based products produced in America, imports were seen on merchant shelves, including wine and brandy.

==== Southern variations ====
Compared with the northern colonies, the southern colonies had a more diverse agricultural diet. The uplands of Piedmont and the coastal lowlands made up the two main parts of the southern colonies.

The diet of the uplands often included wild game, cabbage, string beans, corn, squashes and white potatoes. People had biscuits as part of their breakfast, along with healthy portions of pork. The lowlands of Louisiana included a varied diet heavily influenced by the French, Spanish, Acadians, Germans, Native Americans, Africans, and Caribbeans. Rice played a large part in the diet in Louisiana. In addition, unlike the uplands, the lowlands' protein intake came mostly from coastal seafood. Much of the diet involved the use of peppers, as it still does to this day.

=== Post-colonial cuisine ===
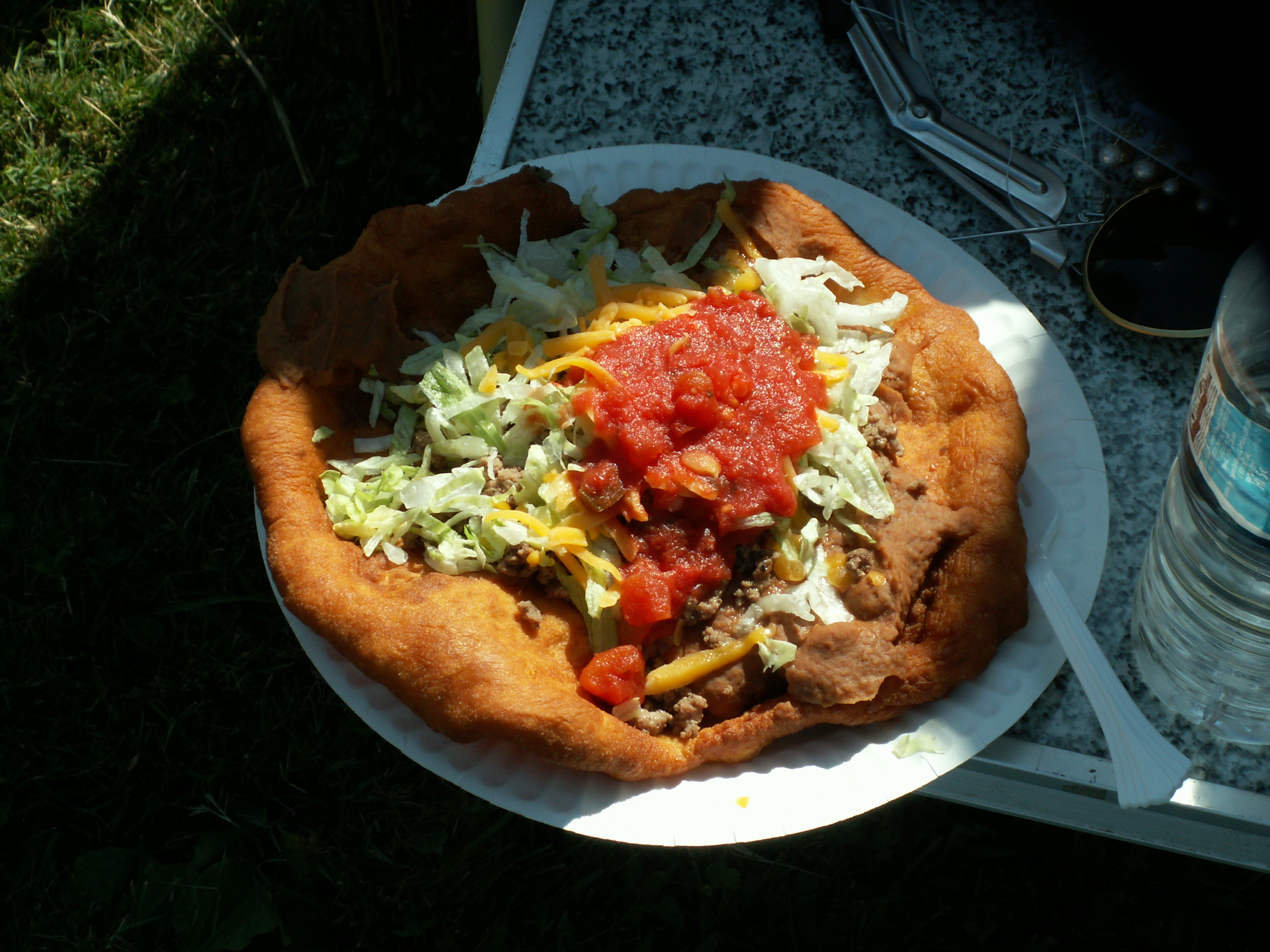
Frybread was created when the Navajo tribe living in Arizona made the 300-mile journey known as the "Long Walk" to New Mexico.

During the 18th and 19th centuries, Americans developed many new foods. Some, such as Rocky Mountain oysters, stayed regional; some spread throughout the nation but with little international appeal, such as peanut butter (a core ingredient of the peanut butter and jelly sandwich); and some spread throughout the world, such as popcorn, cola, cornbread, quickbread muffins such as the poppyseed muffin, and brownies.

==== 19th-century American farmhouse ====
During the 1800s, American farms were mostly self-sufficient, but certain staples like salt, coffee, sugar, and baking soda would be purchased at the town general store. If the family did not grow wheat, then flour would also be purchased. Another luxury was canned salmon, which was sometimes eaten for Sunday dinner. Items purchased at the general store would be paid for with eggs, butter, or some other food from the farm. Women were responsible for much of the processing of food, like straining fresh milk, churning butter, making molasses from sorghum, grinding corn into cornmeal, or cleaning whole chickens. Fresh-picked apples were pressed into cider, which could be fermented to make apple cider vinegar. Fruits and vegetables were preserved by various means like canning, drying or pickling.

One contemporary writer from Michigan described October as cider season, when apple butter would be made. Her writings mention johnnycakes, and, as winter fare, buckwheat cakes.

Typical farmhouse fare included fried chicken, simmered green beans, boiled corn, chicken and dumplings, fried ham, boiled beans and beets, stewed tomatoes, potatoes, and coleslaw made of shredded cabbage. Pon haus, similar to the scrapple of the Pennsylvania Dutch, was a typical breakfast dish among the Germans who had settled Indiana in the 19th century.

Pork scraps and corn meal were cooked into a thick porridge and molded in loaf pans. Once solidified, the mixture would be cut and fried. During the fall months, pork might be replaced with fried apples or potatoes. It was served with buttered biscuits, jam, jelly, milk gravy, or sorghum syrup. Fruit butter might be made from apples, plums, or peaches to accompany the meal.

"A whole new class of city dwellers, harried, worried, furtive, hungry-looking people, have come into being in the wake of the kitchenette, and no modern influence has had so great a part in affecting the morals, health and spiritual well-being of a generation as has this ill-shapen, ill-planned adjunct of modern living"

— Jane Pride, New York Herald

=== 20th century ===
The 20th century revolutionized American cooking, with the advent of many new technologies and a continued influx of immigrants with unique food traditions.

==== Pre-World War I ====
At the universities, nutritionists and home economists taught a new scientific approach to food. In the early 1900s muckraking journalists raised public concern about the wholesomeness of industrialized food products that contained various preservatives and adulterants of unknown safety. From 1902 to 1912 Harvey Washington Wiley, a chemist at the U.S. Department of Agriculture, supervised "hygienic table trials" to test the safety of food additives and preservatives. His work contributed to the enactment of the Pure Food and Drug Act of 1906. He became the first commissioner of the FDA and later led the laboratories of Good Housekeeping Magazine.

During World War I, the Progressives' moral advice about food conservation was emphasized in large-scale state and federal programs designed to educate housewives. Large-scale foreign aid during and after the war brought American standards to Europe.

From 1912 to the end of the 1930s, researchers discovered and popularized the role of various vitamins and minerals in human health. Starting with iodized salt in 1924, commercially distributed food began to be fortified with vitamins and minerals. In 1932, milk began to be fortified with viosterol, a purified vitamin D2 product. Synthetic thiamin (vitamin B1) first became available after 1936, and bakers began voluntarily enriching bread with high-vitamin yeast or synthetic vitamins in the late 1930s.

The cookware of the period was made of cast iron and was thoroughly seasoned with pork fat. Fried salt pork with gravy was an indulgent, fat-laden dish often served with boiled potatoes. In the Appalachian region, a dish called "killed lettuce" was made with pokeweed, dandelion, and assorted wild greens that were drizzled with hot bacon grease until wilted or "killed".

Pie could be served up to three times a day, and a wide variety was prepared depending on the season. During the spring months, pies would be made of rhubarb and strawberry; in summer peach, cherry, blackberry, blueberry, elderberry and grape; and in fall apple.

The staples of the urban diet were bread, dairy, and canned goods. Dinner might be tomato bisque from a can topped with cream or a salad made of canned string beans and mayonnaise. Many preferred to purchase food at delicatessens, rather than attempt to prepare meals in the cramped kitchenettes.

German delicatessens in cities like New York and Milwaukee sold imported cold cuts, potato salads, schmierkase, wienerwurst, North Sea herring, assorted pickles (pickled cucumber) and other prepared foods. Jewish immigrants from Germany soon followed suit, replacing pork dishes with corned beef (salt-cured beef) and pastrami. Ice cream soda was served at soda fountains, along with various other early "soda water" recipes like the Garden Sass Sundae (rhubarb) or the Oh-Oh-Cindy Sundae (strawberry ice cream topped with chocolate syrup, chopped nuts, whipped cream, and candied cherries).

During that same time frame, grain-feeding of cattle in the low-pasture months made milk increasingly available year-round. The invention of milking machines lowered production costs. Pasteurization, homogenization, evaporation, condensation, and refrigeration along with glass milk bottles, wax-paper cartons, and then plastic bottles made milk increasingly available and safe for urban consumers. Milk became a staple food item and an increasingly important ingredient in American cuisine. Examples include the root beer float and the milkshake.

Pork was a staple of the rural diet through the Southern and Midwestern United States. Lard was used for baking, frying, and even as a seasoning.

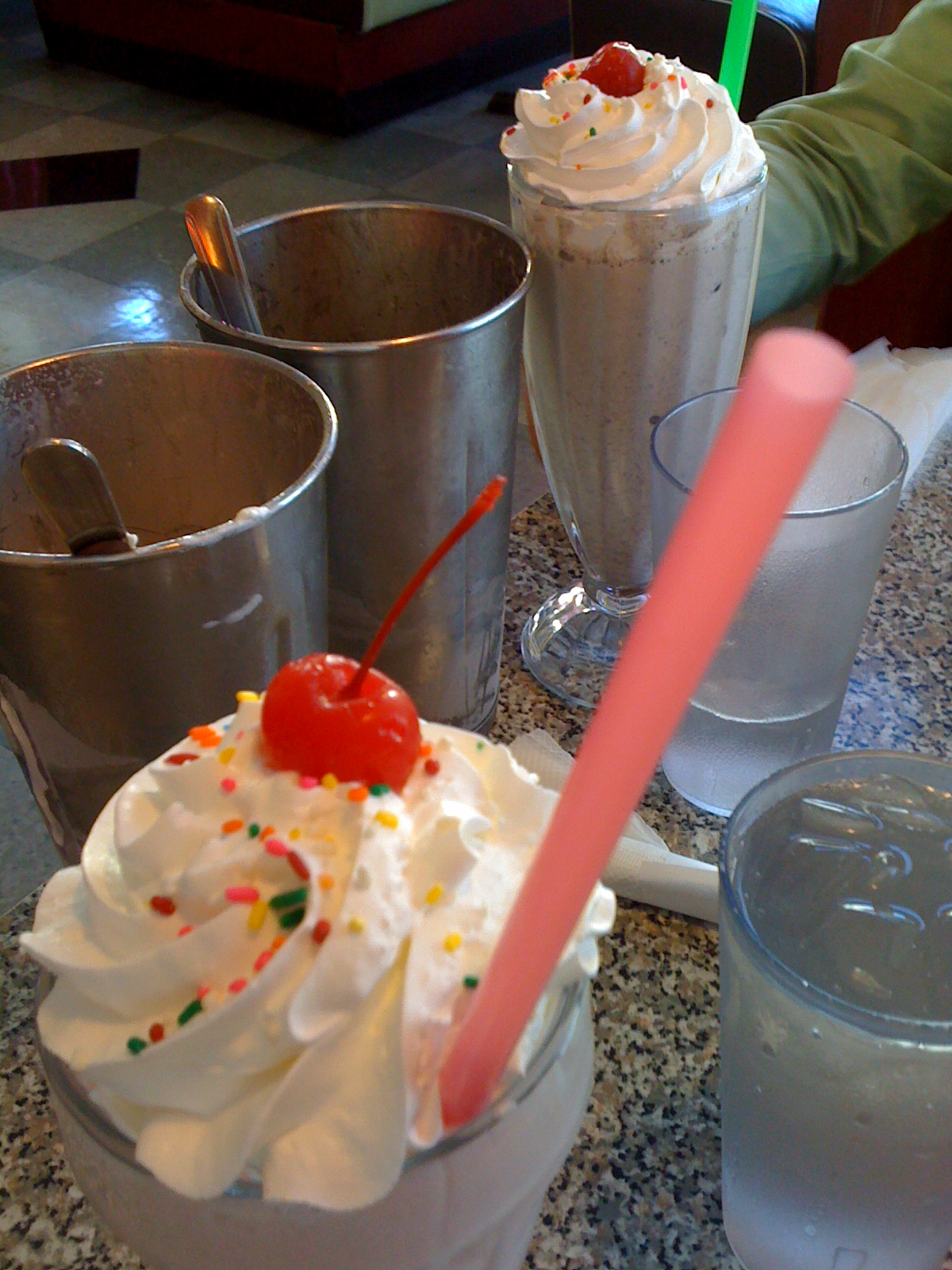
A strawberry and a chocolate shake, each topped with whipped cream, sprinkles, and a maraschino cherry

Major railroads featured upscale cuisine in their dining cars. Restaurant chains emerged with standardized decor and menus, including the Fred Harvey restaurants along the route of the Santa Fe Railroad in the Southwest.

==== World War II and later ====
The Food and Nutrition Board of the National Academy of Sciences established the first set of "Recommended Dietary Allowances" in 1941. In 1943, the US War Food Administration issued the War Food Order No. 1, which made enriched bread the law of the land.

In 1945, George Stigler published an article on "The cost of subsistence", which described the so-called Stigler diet, his solution to the problem of providing a diet that met the RDA at a minimum cost.

The logistical requirements of the US military during WW2 and the Korean War spurred the development and growth of the processed foods industry in the US. These wars encouraged the production of shelf-stable ingredients processed on a vast industrial scale. Examples include powdered milk, powdered eggs, potato flakes, and frozen concentrated orange juice.

After the war, low-cost, highly processed foods became a foundational element of an era of mass prosperity. Many companies in the American food industry developed new products requiring minimal preparation, such as frozen entrees. One such example is the TV dinner in which a multi-course meal was assembled in aluminum packaging in a food factory and flash frozen, then reheated at home in a thermal oven to be served while watching TV. Convenience foods of the era were designed to simplify home preparation.

One example is macaroni and cheese, made with a powdered artificial cheese product reconstituted at home with fresh milk. Newspapers and magazines ran recipe columns, aided by research from the corporate kitchens of major food manufacturers such as General Mills, Campbell's, and Kraft Foods. For example, General Mills Betty Crocker's Cookbook, first published in 1950, was a popular book in American homes.

Highly processed foods of the mid-20th century included novelty elements like multi-colored Jell-O using various chemical food colorings, prepared breakfast cereals marketed to children with large amounts of sugar and artificial colors (e.g. Froot Loops). Fruit-flavored punches made with artificial fruit flavorings (e.g. Tang, Hi-C). Mid-20th-century foods also added novelty packaging elements like spray cheese in an aerosol can, pimento-stuffed olives, and drink pouches.

The development of the microwave oven resulted in the creation of industrial food products and packaging intended to take advantage of the opportunities and overcome the unique challenges of that technology. Microwave popcorn is an example of such a product.

Throughout the second half of the 20th century, the US commercial food system has become increasingly dependent on subsidized corn (maize) production to provide feed for livestock and ingredients for human foods such as high-fructose corn syrup. It is estimated that the typical American gets 70 percent of their carbon intake from corn sources.

The last half of the 20th century saw the development of controversial technological innovations intended to lower the cost of or increase the safety of commercial food, including food irradiation, genetically modified organisms, livestock treated with antibiotics/hormones, and concentrated animal feeding operations. Activists have raised concerns about the wholesomeness, safety, or humaneness of these innovations and recommend alternatives such as organic produce, veganism/vegetarianism, and locavore diets.

Fast-food restaurants with standardized products and franchised service models began to appear and spread as the highway system developed. White Castle (1916) was one of the first examples. Franchising was introduced in 1921 by A&W Root Beer. The McDonald brothers created their "Speedee Service System" in 1948. Other examples include Burger King, Wendy's, Pizza Hut, Domino's Pizza, Subway, Arby's, KFC, Popeyes and Taco Bell.

=== Ethnic influences ===
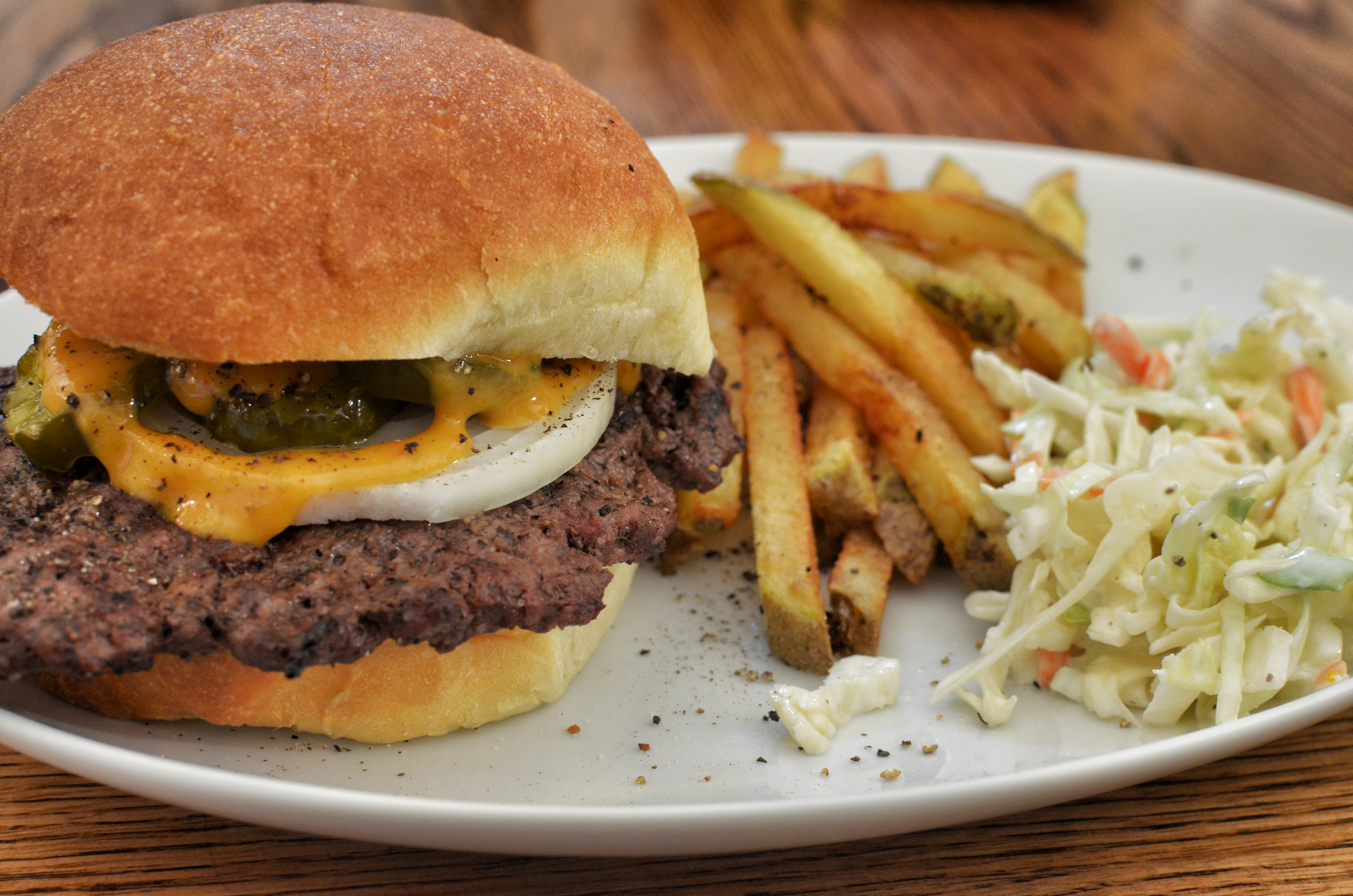
A cheeseburger served with fries and coleslaw

One signature characteristic of American cooking is the fusion of multiple ethnic or regional approaches into completely new cooking styles. For example, spaghetti is Italian, while hot dogs are German; a popular meal, especially among young children, is spaghetti with slices of hot dogs. Since the 1960s, Asian cooking has played a particularly large role in American fusion cuisine.

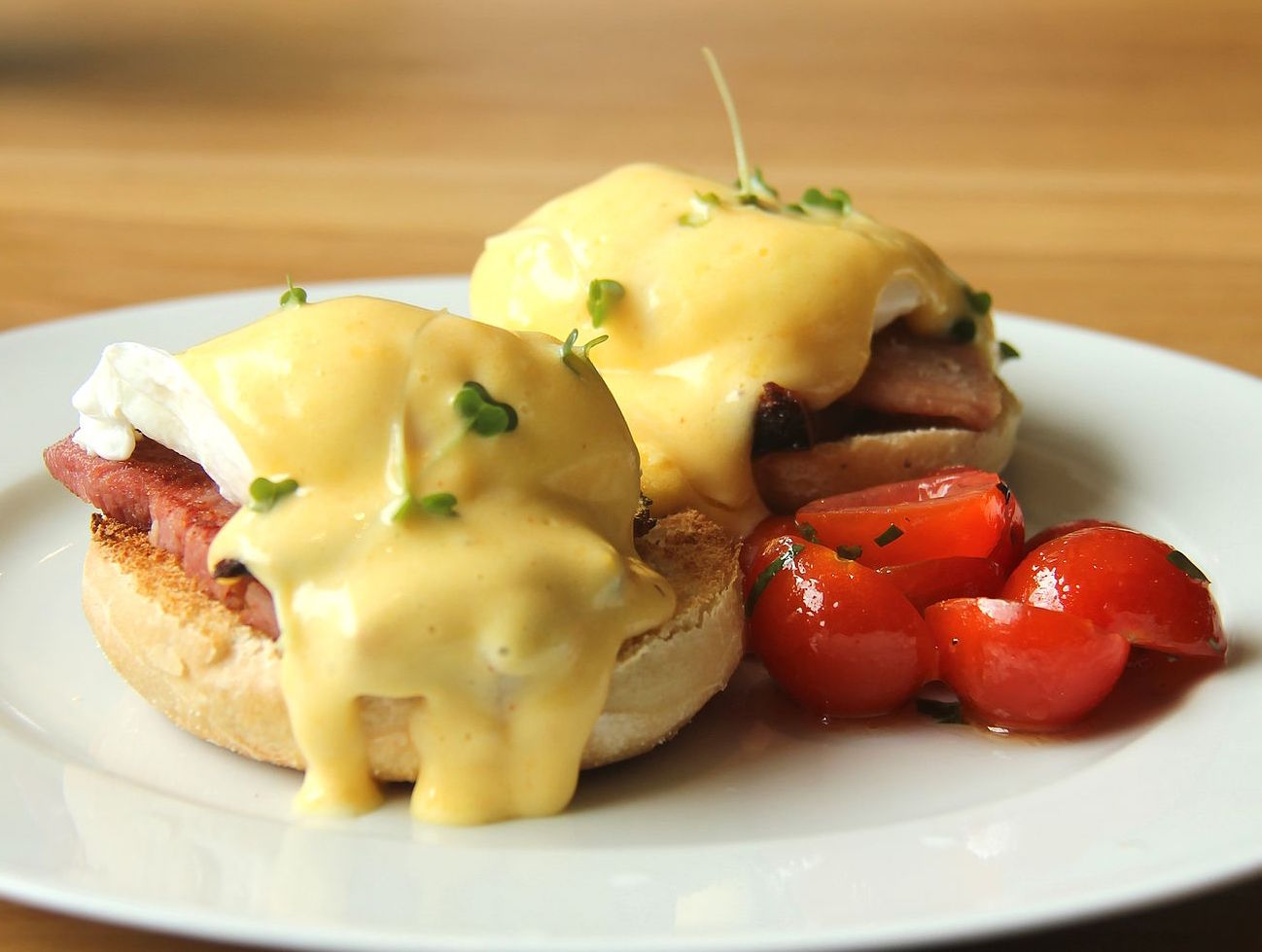
Eggs Benedict, an American breakfast dish made with poached eggs and hollandaise sauce.

Some dishes that are typically considered American have their origins in other countries. American cooks and chefs have substantially altered these dishes over the years, to the point that the dishes now enjoyed around the world are considered American. Hot dogs and hamburgers are both based on traditional German dishes, but in their modern popular form they can be reasonably considered American dishes.

Pizza is based on the traditional Italian dish, brought to the United States by Italian immigrants, but varies widely in style depending on the region of development since its arrival. For example, Chicago-style pizza features a thicker, taller crust, whereas a "New York Slice" is known for its much thinner crust, which can be folded. These different types of pizza can be advertised throughout the country and are generally recognizable and well-known, with some restaurants going so far as to import New York tap water from a thousand or more miles away to recreate the signature style in other regions.

Some dishes that Americans think of as "foreign" or associated with a particular immigrant group were, in fact, invented in America and customized to American tastes. For example, General Tso's chicken was invented by Chinese or Taiwanese chefs working in New York in the early 1970s. The dish is unknown in China, except for a distant resemblance to a much spicier dish from Hong Kong said to have influenced the American version. The fortune cookie was likewise invented in California in the early 1900s and is known in Asia only as an American-style food.

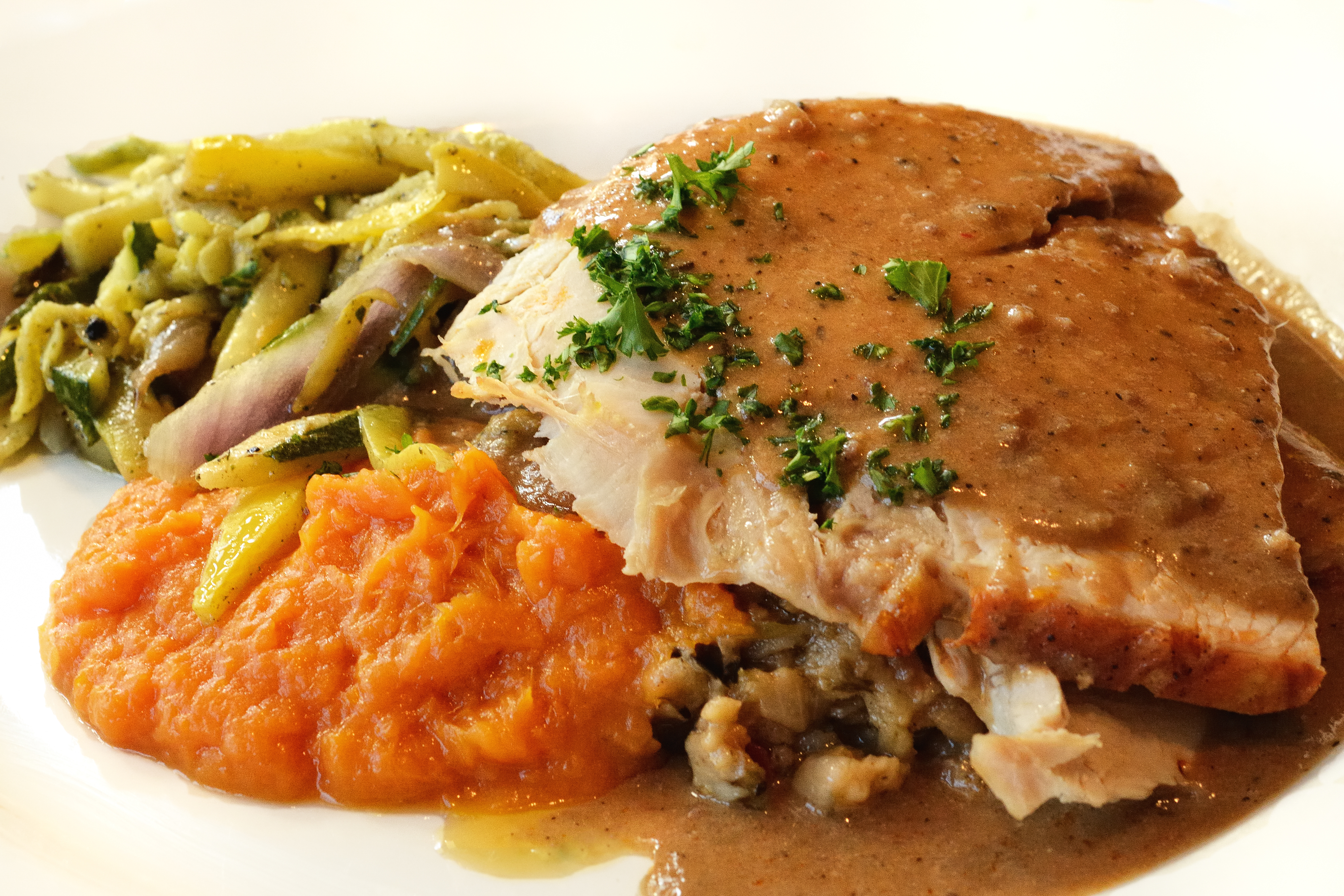
A modern dish consisting of traditional roasted turkey, sweet potatoes, and grilled vegetables prepared with modern fusion ingredients

A wave of celebrity chefs began with Julia Child and Graham Kerr in the 1970s, with many more following after the rise of cable channels like Food Network. Probably the best-known television chef was Child, who taught French cuisine in her weekly show, The French Chef.

=== New American ===
During the 1980s, upscale restaurants introduced a mixing of cuisines that contain Americanized styles of cooking with foreign elements commonly referred to as New American cuisine, a type of fusion cuisine combining flavors from the melting pot of traditional American cooking techniques with those from other cultures, sometimes adding molecular gastronomy components.

=== 21st century ===
By the beginning of the 21st century, regional variations in meat consumption began to decline as overall meat consumption increased. Saying they eat too much protein, the 2015–2020 Dietary Guidelines for Americans asked men and teenage boys to increase their consumption of underconsumed foods such as vegetables. Vegan and vegetarian meals have increased in popularity, with more restaurants catering to vegans and vegetarians.

== Regional cuisines ==
In the present day, the cuisine of the United States is highly regional. Excluding Alaska and Hawaii, the terrain spans 3,000 miles (4,800 km) from east to west and more than 1,000 miles (1,600 km) from north to south.

=== Northeast ===
==== New England ====
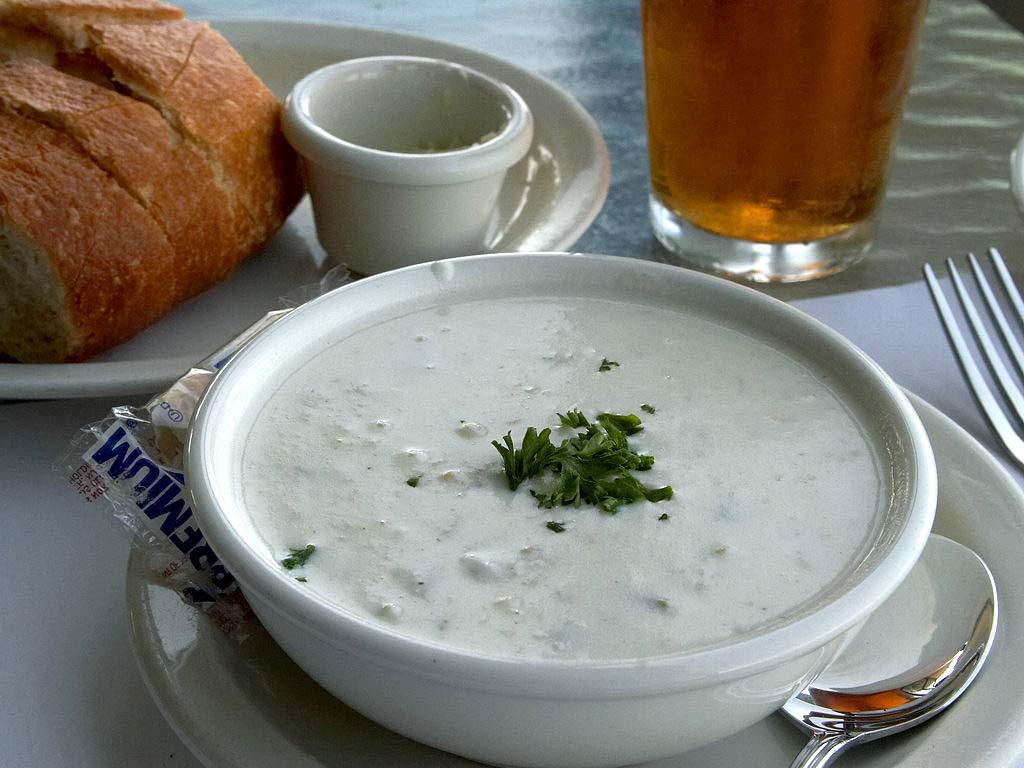
New England clam chowder

New England cuisine traces its roots to English cuisine and the Native American cuisine of the Abenaki, Narragansett, Niantic, Wabanaki, Wampanoag, and other native peoples. It also includes influences from French, Italian, and Portuguese cuisine, among others. It is characterized by the extensive use of potatoes, beans, dairy products and seafood. Corn, historically the main crop grown by Native American tribes in New England, continues to be grown in all New England states. It is traditionally used in hasty pudding, cornbread and corn chowder. Three prominent foodstuffs native to New England are maple syrup, cranberries and blueberries. Maine is the only state with a commercial wild blueberry industry, with 105 million pounds harvested in 2021.

Initial European colonists came from East Anglia in England. East Anglian cookery included dishes such as suet puddings, soda breads, and a few shellfish delicacies, and would have been quite simple compared with the dishes prepared in contemporary London. Most of this cuisine was one-pot cookery, which developed into such dishes as succotash, chowder, baked beans, and others.

The most popular starches in New England cuisine include potatoes and cornmeal, and a few native breads like Anadama bread, johnnycakes, bulkie rolls, Parker House rolls, popovers, ployes, and New England brown bread. Because of the influence of New England health reformers, the most well-known of whom is Sylvester Graham, this region is fairly conservative with its spices. Still, typical spices include nutmeg, ginger, cinnamon, cloves, and allspice, especially in desserts, and for savory foods, thyme, black pepper, sea salt, and sage. Typical condiments include maple syrup, grown from the native sugar maple, molasses, and cranberry sauce.

The fruits of the region include the Vitis labrusca grapes used in grape juice made by companies such as Welch's, along with jelly, Kosher wine by companies like Mogen David and Manischewitz along with other wineries that make higher quality wines. Though not anywhere near as productive a region as the top three apple-producing regions, apples have been a staple of New England foodways since at least the 1640s, and it is here that a very high amount of heirloom varieties are found, many of them gaining renewed interest as part of locavore movements and the re-emergence of cider as a beverage of choice. Apples from New England would include varieties imported from their earliest in Europe and a few natives, like Baldwin, Lady, Mother, Pomme Grise, Porter, Roxbury Russet, Rhode Island Greening, Sops of Wine, Hightop Sweet, Peck's Pleasant, Titus Pippin, Westfield-Seek-No-Further, and Duchess of Oldenburg. Beach plum is a small native species with fruits the size of a pinball, which are sought after in summer to make into a jam. Cranberries are another fruit indigenous to the region, often collected in autumn in huge flooded bogs. Thereafter, they are juiced to be drunk fresh for breakfast, or dried and incorporated into salads and quickbreads.

Winter squashes like pumpkin and butternut squashes have been a staple for generations owing to their ability to keep for long periods over icy New England winters and being an excellent source of beta carotene; in summer, they are replaced with pattypan and zucchini, the latter brought to the region by immigrants from Southern Italy a century ago. Blueberries are a very common summertime treat, owing to their importance as a crop, and find their way into muffins, pies and pancakes.

Historically, New England and the other original 13 colonies were major producers of hard cider, and the only reason why this changed was that immigrants from Western and Central Europe preferred beer, especially lagers, to apple-based alcohol. In more recent years, cider has made a roaring comeback nationwide, with New England being the first to break out of the box, and with many pomologists scouring the woods for abandoned apple trees and heirloom varieties to add to the cider press. Angry Orchard is a local commercial brand that began in New Hampshire but has since skyrocketed in sales, with other large marques following suit around the land.

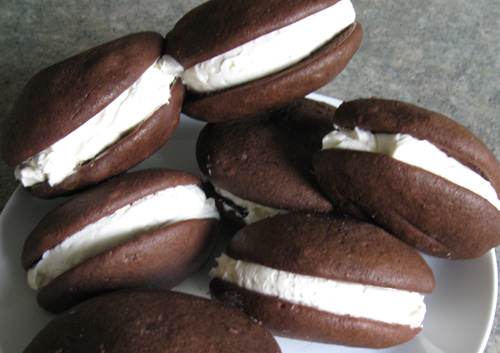
Whoopie pies

Typical desserts are quite diverse, and encompass hasty pudding, blueberry pie, whoopie pies, Boston cream pie, pumpkin pie, Joe Frogger cookies, hand-crafted ice cream, Hermit cookies, and the chocolate chip cookie, which was invented in Massachusetts in the 1930s.

New England is noted for its heavy emphasis on seafood, a legacy inherited from coastal tribes like the Wampanoag and Narragansett, who relied on the rich offshore fishing grounds for sustenance. Favorite fish include cod, salmon, winter flounder, haddock, striped bass, pollock, hake, bluefish, and, in southern New England, tautog. All of these are prepared numerous ways, such as frying cod for fish fingers, grilling bluefish over hot coals for summertime, smoking salmon or serving a whole poached one chilled for feasts with a dill sauce, or, on cold winter nights, serving haddock baked in casserole dish with a creamy sauce and crumbled breadcrumbs as a top so it forms a crust. Clam cakes, a savory fritter based on chopped clams, are a specialty of Rhode Island. Also, a hard shell clam unique to Rhode Island, called the Quahog, is used in clear chowders. Farther inland, brook trout, largemouth bass, and herring are sought after, especially in the rivers and icy finger lakes in upper New England, where New Englanders will fly fish for them in summertime.

Meat is present though not as prominent, and typically is either stewed in dishes like Yankee pot roast and New England boiled dinner or braised, as in a picnic ham; these dishes suit the weather better as summers are humid and hot but winters are raw and cold, getting below 0 °C for most of the winter and only just above it by March. The roasting of whole turkeys began here as a centerpiece for large American banquets, and like all other East Coast tribes, the Native American tribes of New England prized wild turkeys as a source of sustenance and later Anglophone settlers were enamored of cooking them using methods they knew from Europe: often that meant trussing the bird and spinning it on a string or spit roasting. Today, turkey meat is a key ingredient in soups and a favorite in several sandwiches, such as the Pilgrim. For lunch, hot roast beef is sometimes finely chopped and served on a roll with salami and American or provolone cheese to make a steak bomb. Bacon is often maple cured, and often bacon or salt pork drippings are an ingredient in corn chowder, a cousin of clam chowder. Veal consumption was prevalent in the North Atlantic States before World War II.

A variety of linguiça is favored as a breakfast food, introduced by Portuguese fishermen and Brazilian immigrants. Dairy farming and its resultant products figure strongly on the ingredient list, and homemade ice cream is a summertime staple of the region: it was a small seasonal roadside stand in Vermont that eventually became the internationally famous Ben and Jerry's ice cream. Vermont is known for producing farmhouse-style cheeses, especially a type of cheddar. The recipe goes all the way back to colonial times when English settlers brought the recipe with them from England and found the rocky landscape eminently suitable to making the cheese. Today Vermont has more artisanal cheese makers per capita than any other state, and diversity is such that interest in goat's milk cheeses has become prominent.

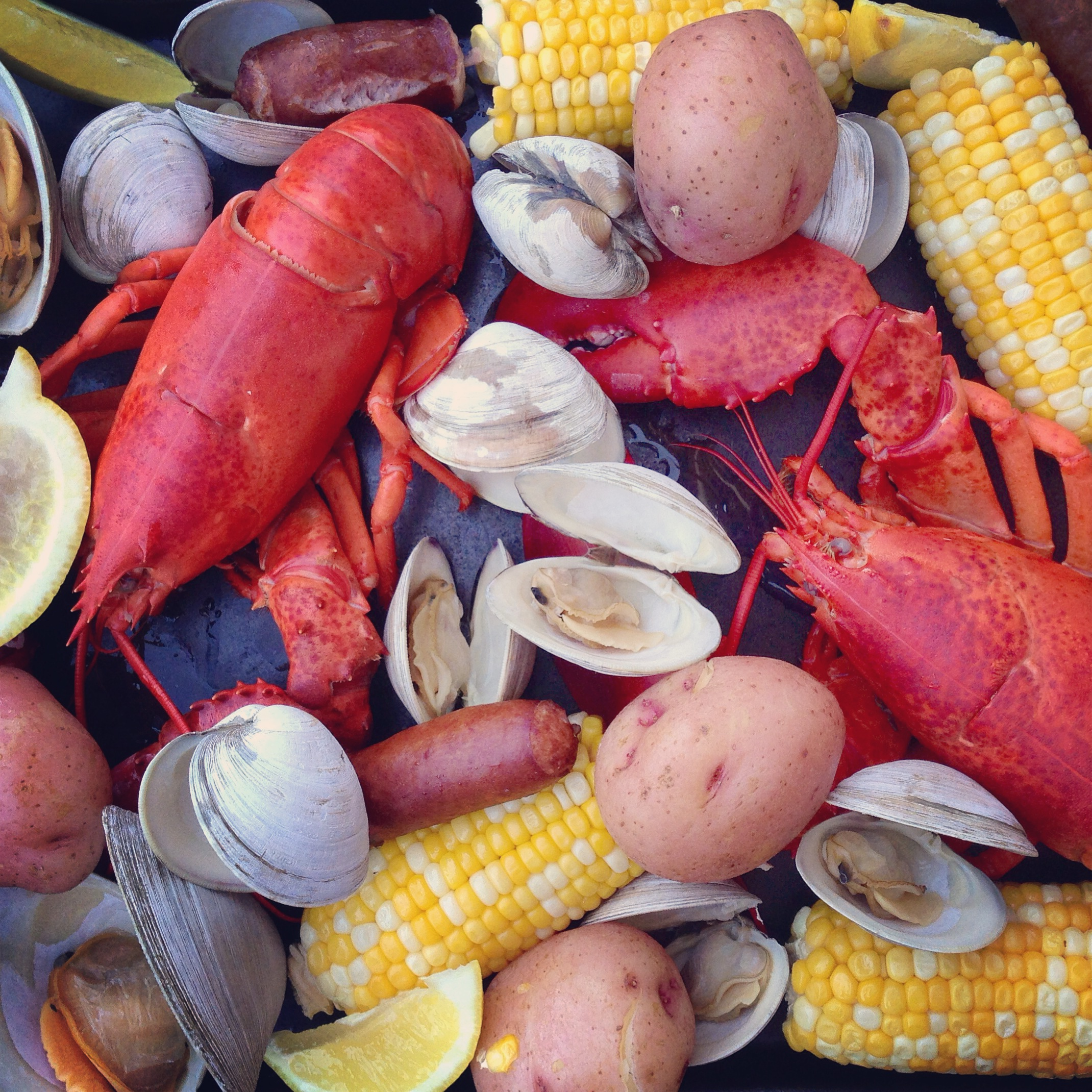
A New England clambake

Crustaceans and mollusks are also essential ingredients in the regional cookery. Maine and Massachusetts, in more recent years, have taken to harvesting Peekytoe crab and Jonah crab and making crab bisques, based on cream with 35% milkfat, and crabcakes out of them: often these were overlooked as bycatch of lobster pots by fishermen of the region, but in the past 30 years their popularity has firmly established them as a staple. They even appear on menus as far south as New York, where they are sold to four-star restaurants in the form of cocktail claws. Whelks are eaten in salad, and lobster, which is indigenous to the coastal waters of the region and are a feature of many dishes, baked, boiled, roasted, and steamed, or eaten as a sandwich, chilled with mayonnaise and chopped celery in Maine and Massachusetts, or slathered with melted butter on Long Island and in Connecticut. Shellfish of all sorts are part of the diet, and shellfish of the coastal regions include little neck clams, sea scallops, blue mussels, oysters, soft shell clams, and razor shell clams. Much of this shellfish contributes to New England tradition, the clambake. The clambake as known today is a colonial interpretation of an American Indian tradition.

In summer, oysters and clams are dipped in batter and fried, often served in a basket with French fries, or commonly on a wheaten bun as a clam roll. Oysters are otherwise eaten chilled on a bed of crushed ice, half-shell, with mignonette sauce, and are often branded with the place where they were harvested. Large quahogs are stuffed with breadcrumbs and seasoning and baked in their shells, and smaller ones often find their way into clam chowder. Other preparations include clams casino and clams on the half-shell, served stuffed with herbs like oregano and streaky bacon.

Southern New England, particularly along the coast, shares many specialties with the Mid-Atlantic, including especially dishes from Jewish and Italian-American cuisine. There is a so-called pizza belt which stretches from New Haven, Connecticut southward through New York, New Jersey, and into Maryland. Coastal Connecticut is known for distinctive kinds of pizza, locally called apizza (pronounced abeetz), which differ from those of the pizza belt further south in their thin, slightly blackened texture and toppings (such as clams).

==== Delaware River Valley and Mid-Atlantic ====
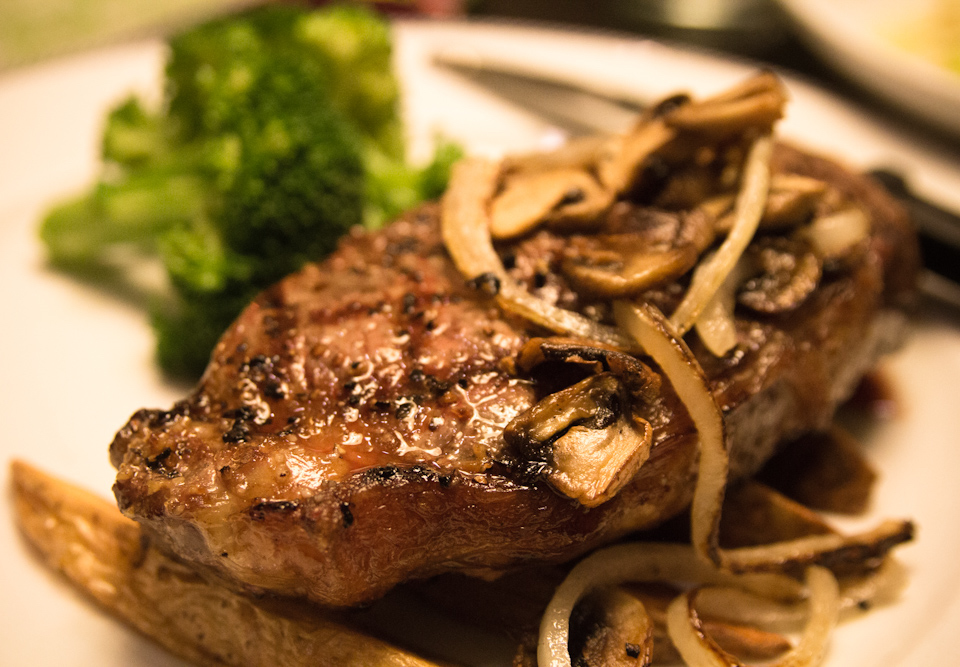
New York strip steak topped with mushrooms and onions

The mid-Atlantic states comprise the states of New York, New Jersey, Delaware, Pennsylvania, and Northern Maryland. The oldest major settlement in this area of the country is found in the most populous city in the nation, New York, founded in 1625 by the Dutch. Today, it is a major cultural capital of the United States.

The influences on cuisine in this region are extremely eclectic, as it has been and continues to be a gateway for international cultures and new immigrants. Going back to colonial times, each new group has left their mark on homegrown cuisine, and in turn, the cities in this region disperse trends to the wider United States. In addition, cities like New York and Philadelphia have had the past influence of Dutch, Italian, German, Irish, British, and Jewish cuisines, and that continues to this day. Baltimore has become the crossroads between North and South, a distinction it has held since the end of the Civil War.

A global power city, New York is well known for its dining scene. Its restaurants compete for positive reviews in the Food and Dining section of The New York Times, online guides, and Zagat's.

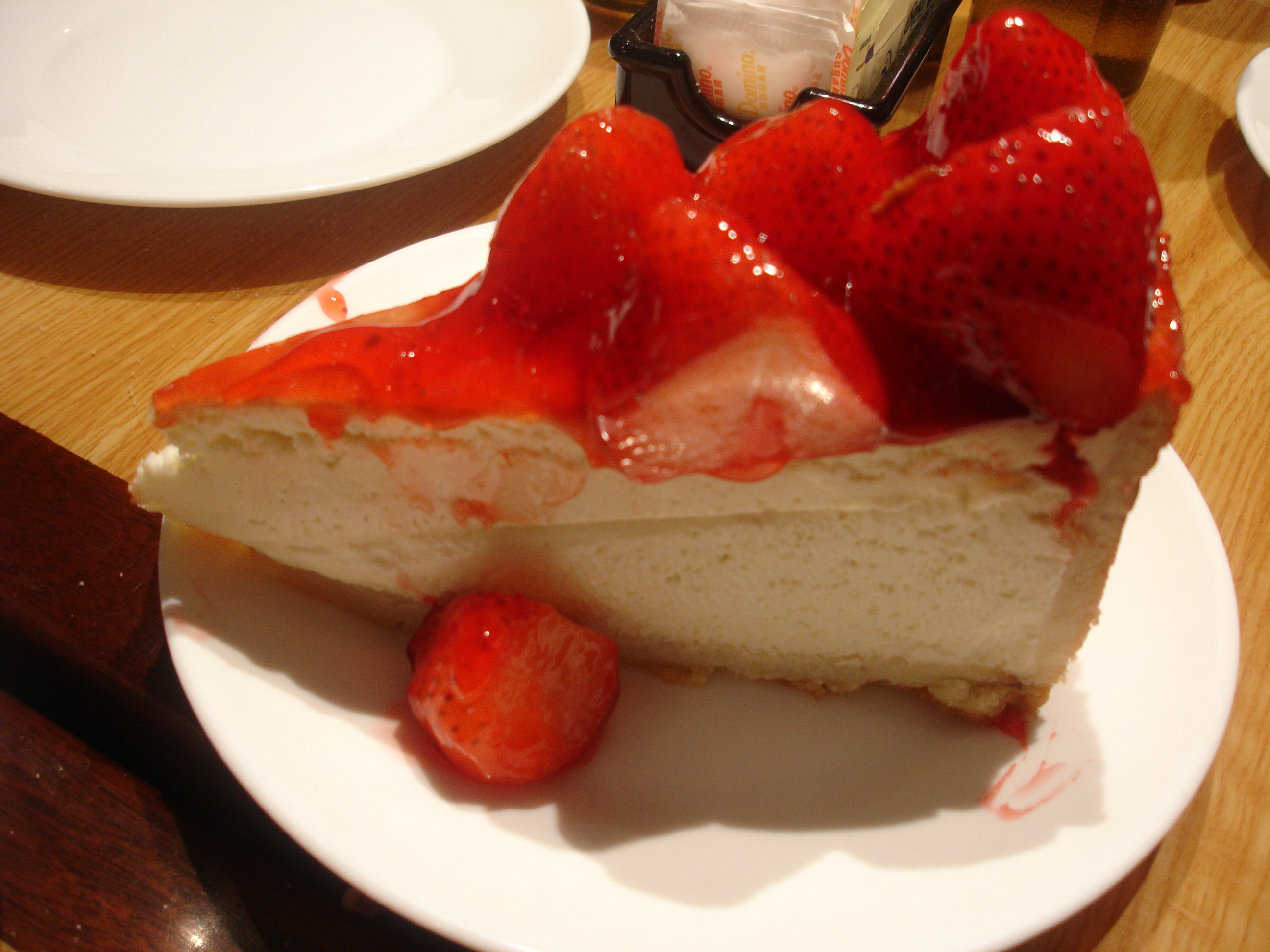
New York–style cheesecake with strawberries. Other variations include blueberry or raspberry sauce.

Many of the more complicated dishes with rich ingredients like Lobster Newberg, waldorf salad, vichyssoise, eggs benedict, and the New York strip steak were born out of a need to entertain and impress the well-to-do in expensive bygone restaurants like Delmonico's and still standing establishments like the Waldorf-Astoria Hotel. Modern commercial American cream cheese was developed in 1872.

Since the first reference to an alcoholic mixed drink called a cocktail comes from New York State in 1803, it is not a surprise that there have been many cocktails invented in New York and the surrounding environs. Even today, New York bars are noted for being highly influential in making national trends. Cosmopolitans, Long Island iced teas, Manhattans, Rob Roys, Tom Collins, Aviations, and Greyhounds were all invented in New York bars, and the gin martini was popularized in New York in speakeasies during the 1920s, as evidenced by its appearance in the works of New Yorker and American writer F. Scott Fitzgerald. Like its neighbor Philadelphia, many rare and unusual liquors and liqueurs often find their way into a mixologist's cupboard or restaurant wine list.

New York State is the third most productive area in the country for wine grapes, just behind California and Washington. It has AVA's near the Finger Lakes, the Catskills, and Long Island, and in the Hudson Valley has the second-most productive area in the country for growing apples, making it a center for hard cider production, just like New England. Pennsylvania has been growing rye since Germans began to emigrate to the area at the end of the 17th century and required a grain they knew from Germany. Therefore, overall it is not unusual to find New York grown Gewürtztraminer and Riesling, Pennsylvania rye whiskey, or marques of locally produced ciders like Original Sin on the same menu.

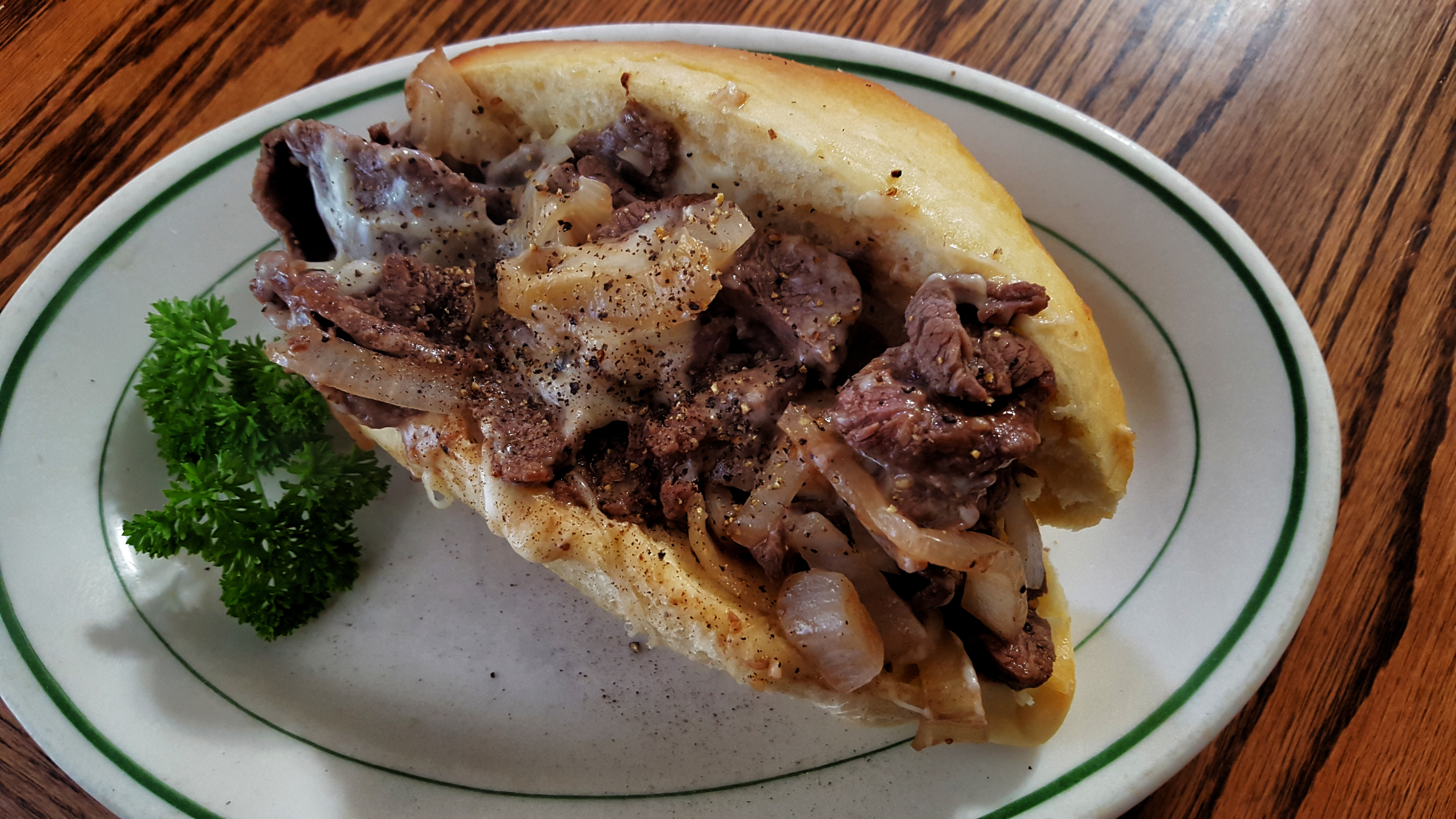
Philadelphia cheesesteak with Cheez Whiz

Since their formative years, New York, Philadelphia, and Baltimore have welcomed immigrants of every kind to their shores, and all three have been important gateways through which new citizens to the general United States arrive. Traditionally, natives have eaten cheek to jowl with newcomers for centuries, as the newcomers would open new restaurants and small businesses, and all the different groups would interact.

Even in colonial days this region was a diverse mosaic of peoples, as settlers from Switzerland, Wales, England, Ulster, Wallonia, Holland, Gelderland, the British Channel Islands, and Sweden sought their fortune in this region. This is evident in many signature dishes and local foods, all of which have evolved to become American dishes in their own right.

The original Dutch settlers of New York brought recipes they knew and understood from the Netherlands, and their mark on local cuisine is still apparent today. In many quarters of New York, their version of apple pie with a streusel top is still baked. In the colony of New Amsterdam, their predilection for waffles in time evolved into the American national recipe and forms part of a New York brunch. They also made coleslaw, originally a Dutch salad, but today it is accented by the later 18th-century introduction of mayonnaise.

The doughnut began its life originally as a New York pastry that arrived in the 18th century as the Dutch olykoek, with later additions from other nations of Europe like the Italian zeppole, the Jewish/Polish pączki, and the German Berliner arriving in the 19th century to complete the variety found in modern doughnuts today.

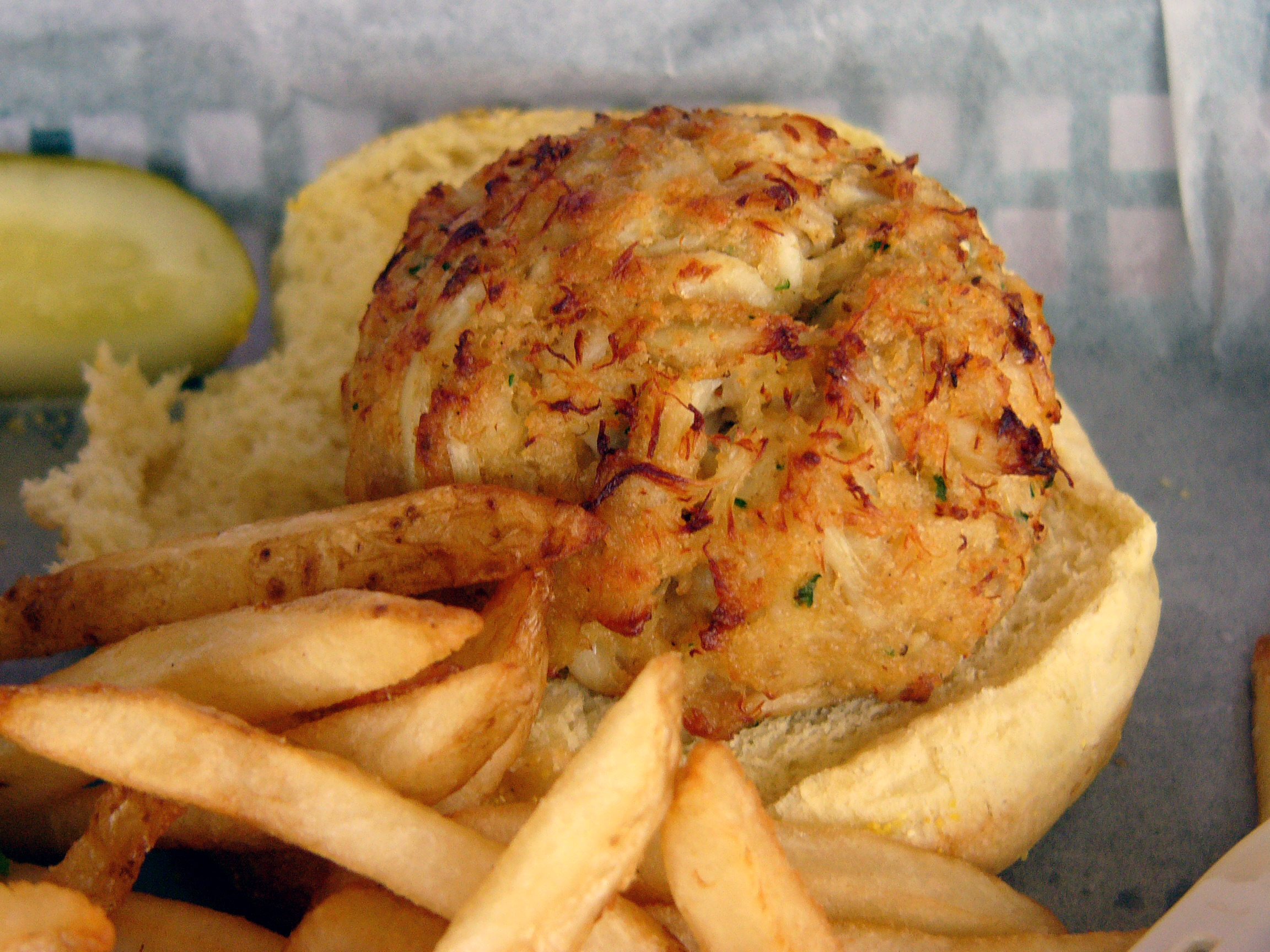
Crab cake, popular in Maryland, Delaware and New Jersey, is often served on a roll.

Crab cakes were once a kind of English croquette, but over time, as spices have been added, they and the Maryland crab feast became two of Baltimore's signature dishes. Fishing for blue crab is a favorite summer pastime in the waters off Maryland, New Jersey, and Delaware, where they may grace the table at summer picnics.

Other mainstays of the region have been present since the early years of American history, such as oysters from Cape May, the Chesapeake Bay, and Long Island, and lobster and tuna from the coastal waters of New York and New Jersey. Philadelphia Pepper Pot, a tripe stew, was originally a British dish but today is a classic of home cooking in Pennsylvania alongside bookbinder soup, a type of turtle soup.

In the winter, New York pushcarts sell roasted chestnuts, a delicacy dating back to English Christmas traditions, and it was in New York and Pennsylvania that the earliest Christmas cookies were introduced: Germans introduced crunchy molasses-based gingerbread and sugar cookies in Pennsylvania, and the Dutch introduced cinnamon-based cookies, all of which have become part of the traditional Christmas meal.

Scrapple was originally a type of savory pudding that early Pennsylvania Germans made to preserve the offal of a pig slaughter. The Philadelphia soft pretzel was originally brought to Eastern Pennsylvania in the early 18th century, and later, 19th-century immigrants sold them to the masses from pushcarts to make them the city's best-known bread product, having evolved into its own unique recipe.

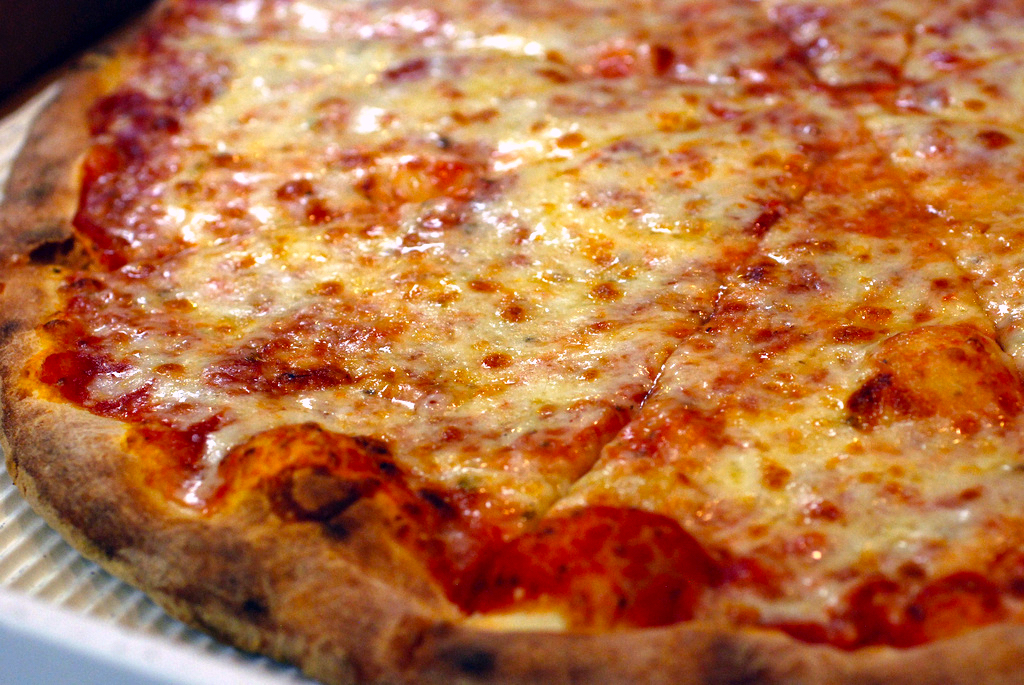
New York–style pizza is the pizza eaten in New York, New Jersey, and Connecticut.

After the 1820s, new groups arrived, and the character of the region changed. There had been some Irish from Ulster before 1820; however, they had largely been Protestants with a somewhat different culture and (often) a different language than the explosion of emigrants that came to Castle Garden and Locust Point in Baltimore in their masses starting in the 1840s.

The Irish arrived in America in a rather woeful state, as Ireland at the time was often plagued by some of the worst poverty in Europe and often heavy disenfranchisement among the masses. Many of them arrived barely alive, having ridden coffin ships to the New World, very sick with typhus and gaunt from prolonged starvation.

In addition, they were the first to face challenges that other groups did not: they were the first large wave of Catholics. They faced prejudice for their faith, and the cities of Philadelphia, New York, and Baltimore were not always set up for their needs.

For example, Catholic bishops in the U.S. mandated until the 1960s that all Catholics were forbidden from eating red meat on Fridays and during Lent, and attending Mass sometimes conflicted with work as produce and meat markets would be open on high holy days; this was difficult for Irishmen supporting families since many worked as laborers.

Unsurprisingly, many Irishmen also found their fortunes working as longshoremen, which would have given their families access to fish and shellfish whenever a fisherman made berth, which was frequent on the busy docks of Baltimore and New York.

Though there had been some activity in Baltimore in founding a see earlier by the Carrolls, the Irish were the first major wave of Catholic worship in this region, and that meant bishops and cardinals sending away to Europe for wine. Wine, with water, is consecrated as part of the Catholic Mass.

Taverns had existed in the region before they emigrated to America. However, the Irish brought their particular brand of pub culture and founded some of the first saloons and bars that served Dublin-style stout and red ale; they also brought with them knowledge of single-malt whiskey and sold it.

The Irish were the first immigrant group to arrive in this region in large numbers, and they also founded some of the earliest saloons and bars, including McSorley's, which is still operating.

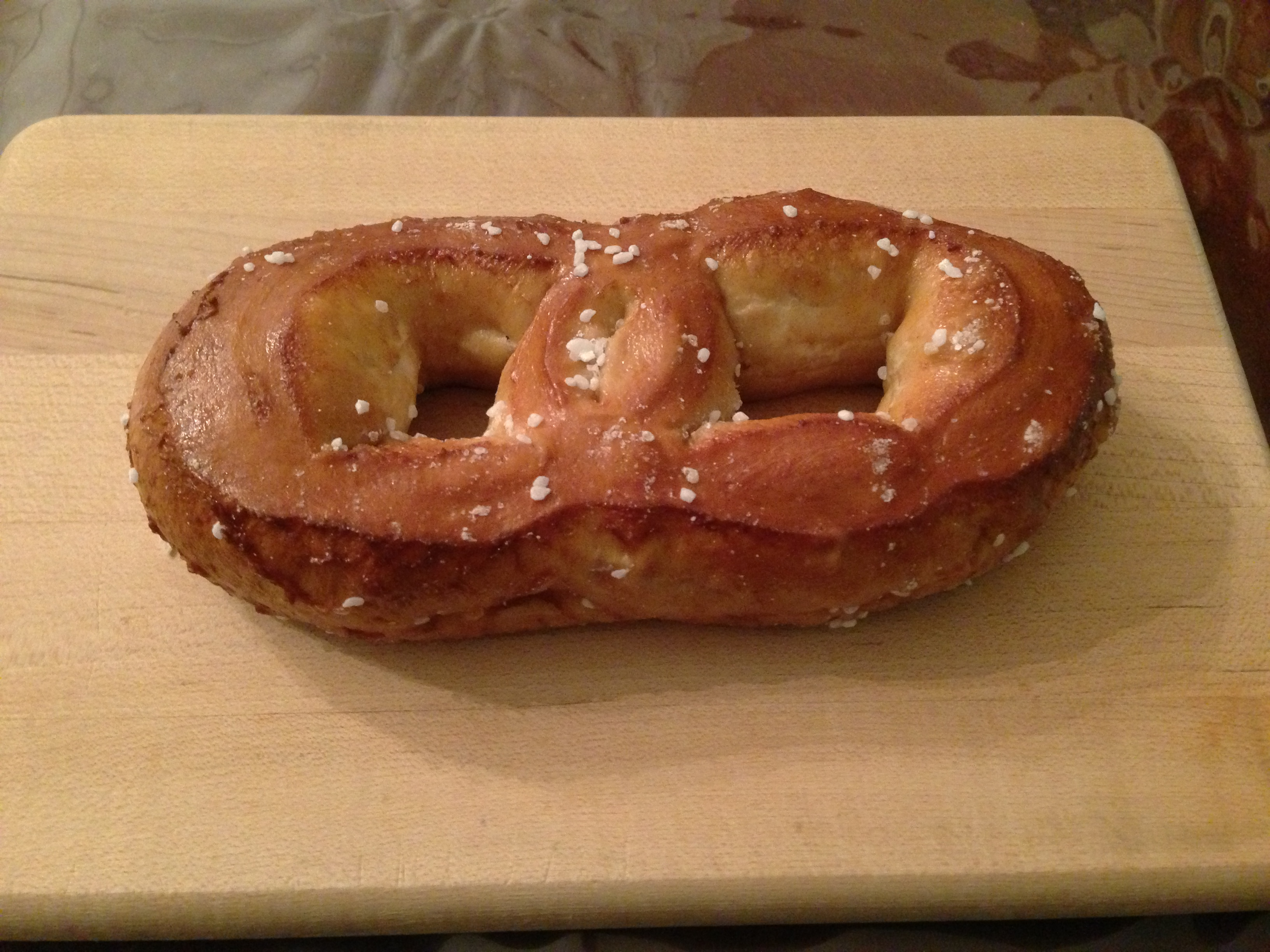
Philadelphia-style soft pretzel

It was also in this region that the Irish introduced Halloween, a very important festival in American culture that involves a large amount of food, drink, and merrymaking. In England and Wales, where many prior immigrants had come from, the feast of All Hallows Eve had died out during the Reformation, dismissed as superstition and excess, having nothing to do with the Bible. It was often replaced by the festival of Guy Fawkes Night. Other immigrant groups, such as the Germans, preferred to celebrate October 31 as Reformation Day. After the American Revolution, all of the above were less and less eager to celebrate the legacy of an English festival, given that they had fought against the Kingdom of Great Britain for their independence.

Catholicism in Ireland demanded attendance at church on November 1 and made charity and deeds, not just faith, a cornerstone of its dogma; many of its older traditions survived the Reformation and traveled with it. Naturally, they went door-to-door to collect victuals for masked parties as well as gave them out, like nuts to roast on the fire, whiskey, beer, or cider, and barmbracks; they also bobbed for apples and made dumb cakes. Later in the century, they were joined by Scots going guising, children going door-to-door to ask for sweets and treats in costume.

From the Mid-Atlantic this trend spread to be nationwide and evolved into American children trick-or-treating on October 31 wearing costumes and their older counterparts having wild costume parties with various foods and drinks such as caramel apples, candy apples, dirt cakes, punch, cocktails, cider (both alcoholic and non,) pumpkin pie, candy corn, chocolate turtles, peanut brittle, taffy, tipsy cake, and copious buckets full of candy; children carving jack-o-lanterns and eating squash derived foods derive from Halloween's heritage as a harvest festival and from Irish and Scottish traditions of carving turnips and eating root vegetables at this time of year.

Bobbing for apples has survived to the present day as a Halloween party classic game, as has a variation on the parlor game of trying to grab an apple hanging from the ceiling blindfolded: it has evolved into trying to catch a donut in one's teeth.

Immigrants from Southern Europe, namely Sicily, Campania, Lazio, and Calabria, appeared between 1880 and 1960 in New York, New Jersey, Pennsylvania, and Eastern Maryland, hoping to escape the extreme poverty and corruption endemic to Italy.

Typically, none of them spoke English, but rather dialects of Italian, and their culture was more closely tied to the village where they were born than to the high culture accessible only to those who could afford it at this time; many could not read or write in any language.

They were employed in manual labor or factory work, but it is because of them that dishes like spaghetti with meatballs, New York–style pizza, calzones, and baked ziti exist, and Americans of today are very familiar with semolina-based pasta noodles.

Their native cuisine placed less emphasis on meat, as evidenced by dishes they introduced, such as pasta e fagioli and minestrone. In contrast, the dishes they created in America often piled it on as a sign of wealth and newfound prosperity since, for the first time, even cheap cuts of it were affordable. The American recipe for lasagna is proof of this, as mostly it is derived from the Neapolitan version of the dish with large amounts of meat and cheese.

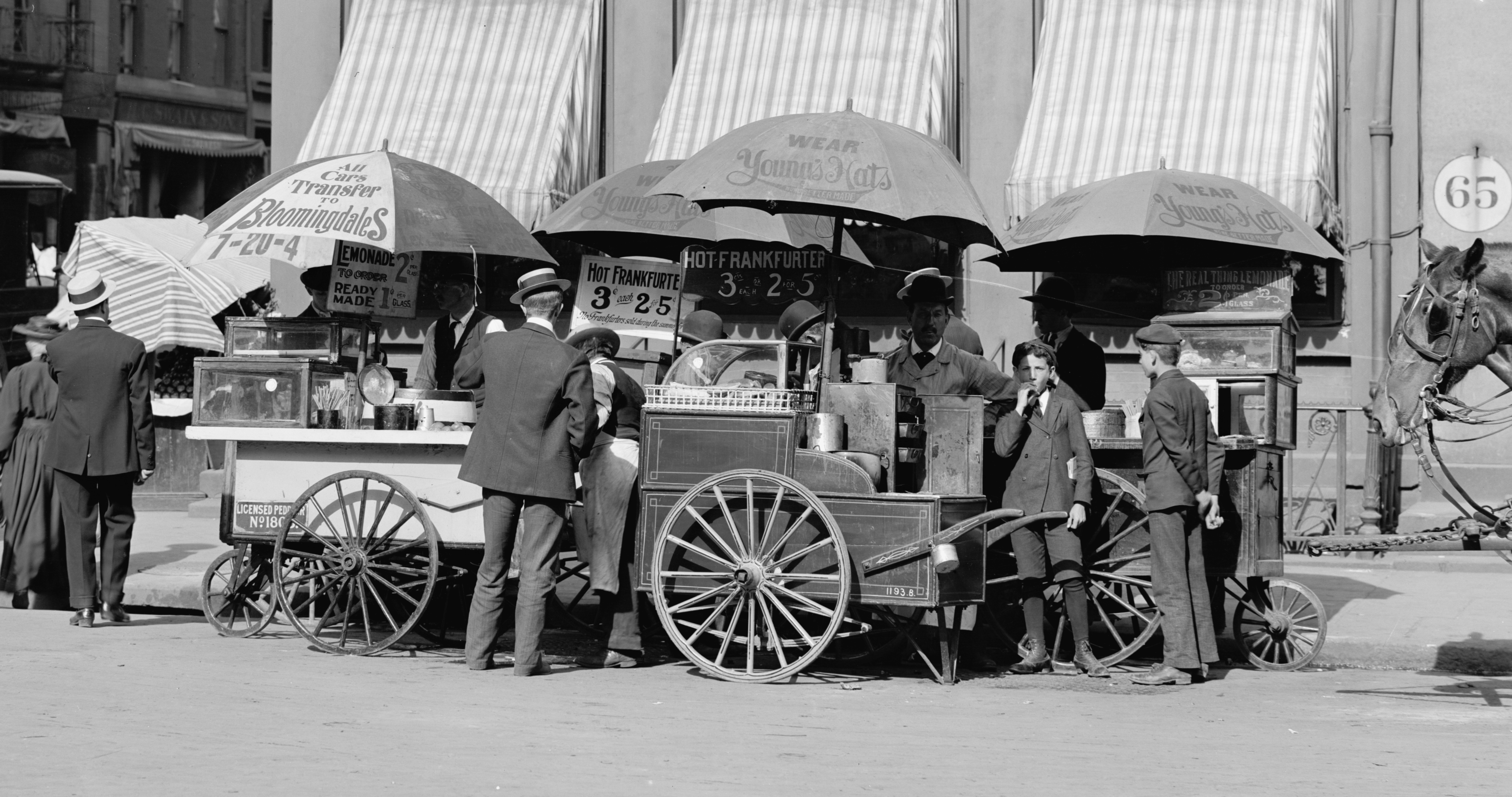
Carts selling frankfurters, the predecessor to hotdogs, in New York circa 1906. The price is listed as "3 cents each or 2 for 5 cents".

New York–style hot dogs came about with German-speaking emigrants from Austria and Germany, particularly with the frankfurter sausage and the smaller wiener sausage; Jews would also contribute here by introducing the kosher version of these sausages, made of beef rather than pork. Today, a typical New York–style hot dog contains sauerkraut, mustard, and cucumber pickle relish. Hot dogs are a typical street food sold year-round, in all but the most inclement weather, by thousands of pushcarts.

As with all other stadiums in Major League Baseball, they are essential for New York Yankees and New York Mets games, though the local style of preparation predominates.

Hot dogs are also the focus of a televised eating contest on the Fourth of July in Coney Island, at Nathan's Famous, one of the earliest hot dog stands opened in the United States in 1916 by Nathan Handwerker. Handwerker was a Jewish man who emigrated from what is now Ukraine in 1912.

Coney Island is most famous for its traditional boardwalk amusement park and as the site of the world's first roller coaster, a precursor to modern theme parks. Hot dogs are a staple of amusement parks 100 years later.

A summertime treat, Italian ice, began as a sweeter adaptation of the Sicilian granita, which was strictly lemon-flavored, and was brought to New York and Philadelphia. Its Hispanic counterpart, piragua, is a common shaved-ice treat brought to New York by Puerto Ricans in the 1930s. Unlike the original dish, which included flavors like tamarind, mango, and coconut, piragua is evolving to include flavors like grape and cherry, fruits that are impossible to grow in the tropical Puerto Rican climate and are exported back to the island from New York.

Taylor Ham, a meat delicacy of New Jersey, first appeared around the time of the Civil War. Today, it is often served for breakfast with eggs and cheese on a kaiser roll, a variant of a roll brought to the area by Austrians in the second half of the 19th century, now commonly used for sandwiches at lunchtime, often topped with poppyseeds. This breakfast meat is generally known as pork roll in southern New Jersey and Philadelphia, and Taylor Ham in northern New Jersey.

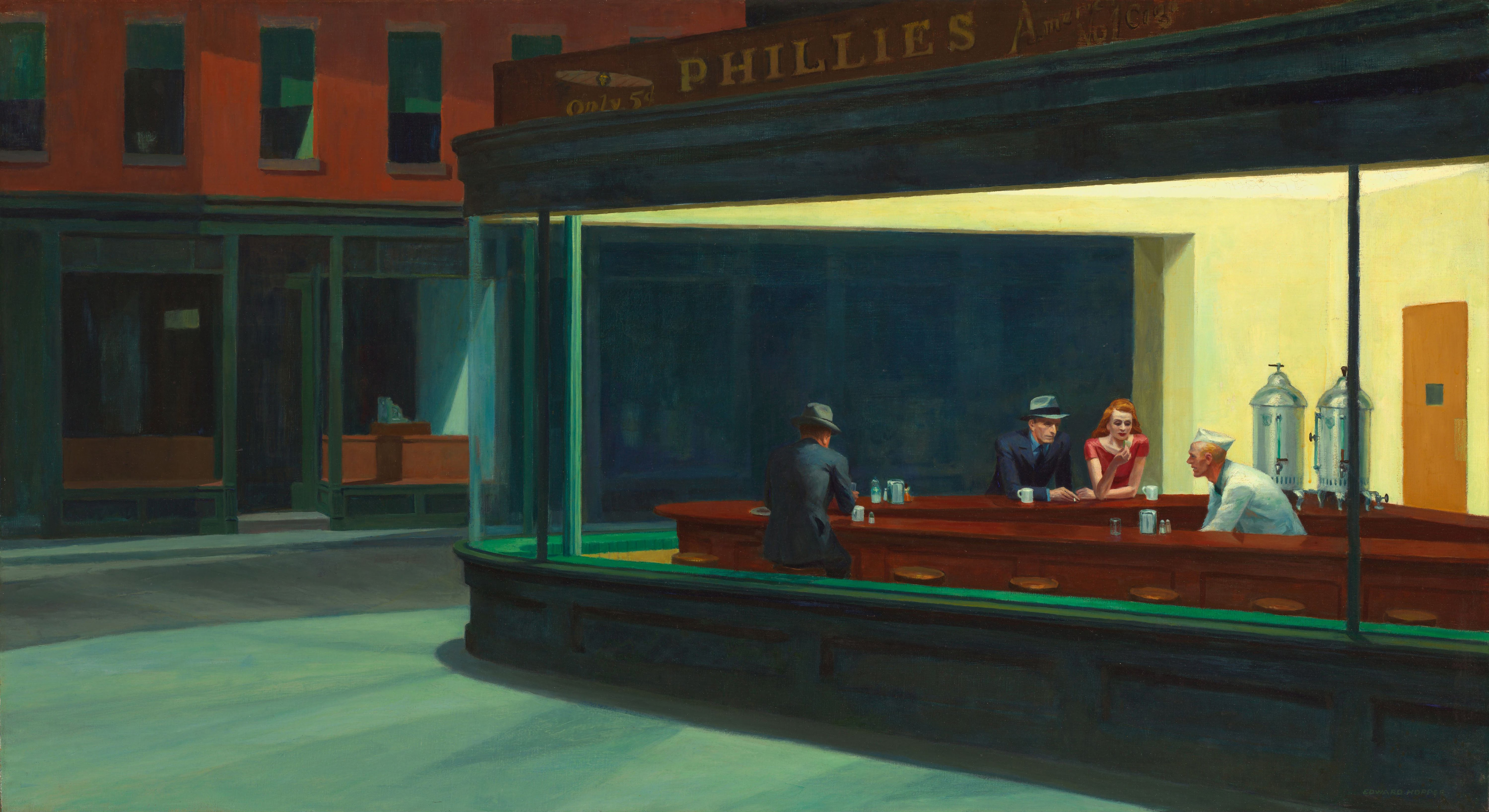
Nighthawks, a painting of a diner, one type of eatery still common in the Mid-Atlantic. Each state of the region has its own signatures, and the range extends from the Canadian border in the North to Delaware Bay in the South.

Other dishes came about during the early 20th century and have much to do with delicatessen fare, set up largely by Jewish immigrants from Eastern Europe who came to America incredibly poor, often illiterate in any other language but Yiddish, and often banished from mainstream society in their place of origin for centuries. Most often, they were unable to participate in the outdoor food markets used by the general population, as most of the food for sale was not kosher.

The influence of European Jewry before their destruction in the Holocaust on modern mid-Atlantic cooking remains strong and reinforced by their many descendants in the region. These currently form the largest concentration of Jews outside Tel Aviv and are very integrated into the local mainstream of New York in particular.

American-style pickles, now a common addition to hamburgers and sandwiches, were brought by Polish Jews, and Austro-Hungarian Jews brought a recipe for almond horns that is now a common regional cookie, diverting from the original recipe in dipping the ends in dark chocolate.

New York–style cheesecake has copious amounts of cream and eggs because animal rennet is not kosher and so could not be sold to a large number of the deli's clientele.

New York inherited its bagels and bialys from Jews, as well as Challah bread. Pastrami first entered the country via Romanian Jews and is a feature of many sandwiches, often eaten on marble rye, a bread that originated in the Mid-Atlantic.

Whitefish salad, lox, and matzoh ball soup are now standard fare made to order at local diners and delicatessens, but started their life as foods that made up a strict dietary code. Rugelach cookies and hamentashen are sweet staples still sold to the general public, but came to New York over a century ago with Ashkenazi Jews along with Jewish rye.

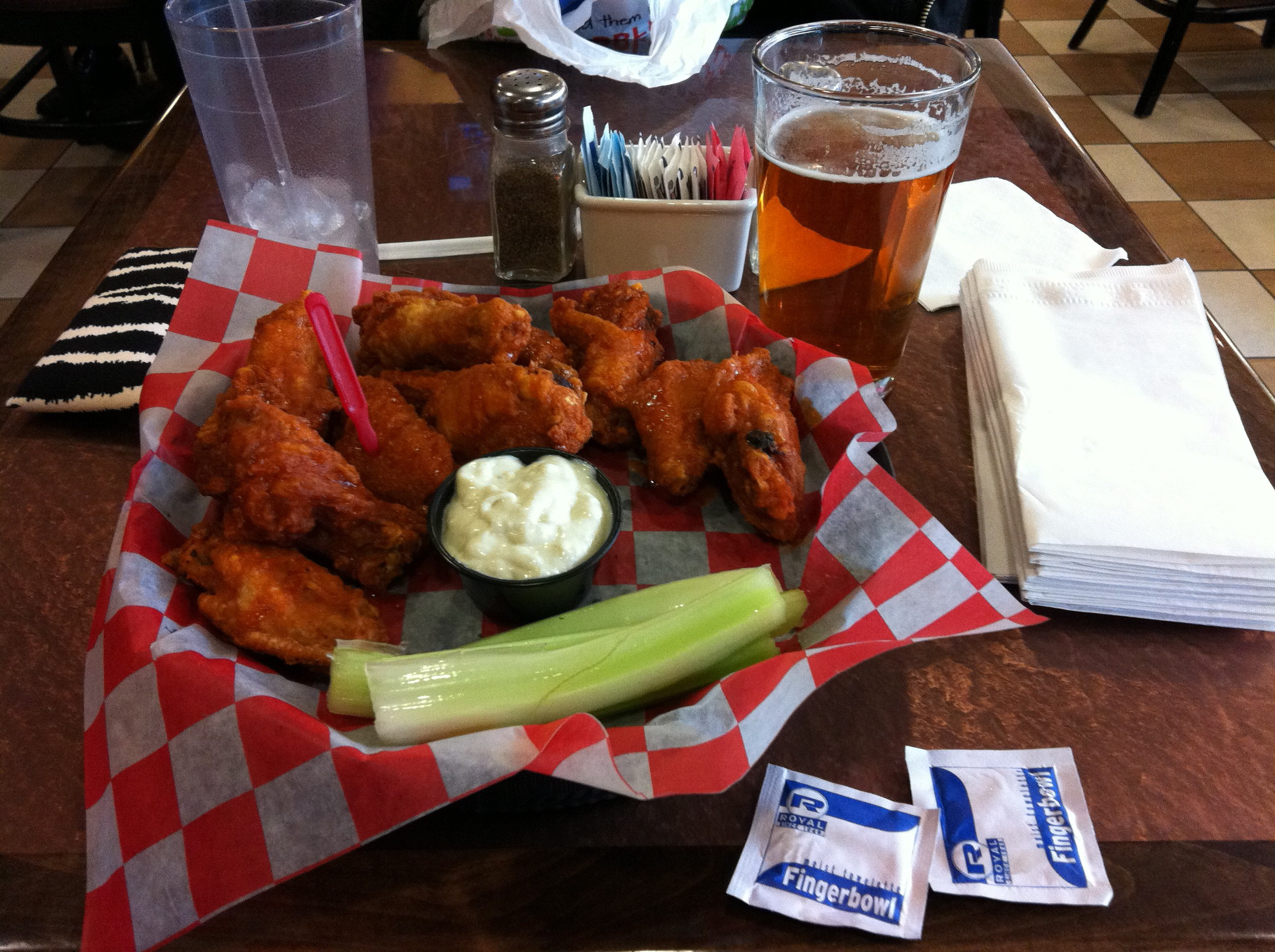
Buffalo wings with blue cheese dressing, served with lager beer

Many of their dishes had entered the mainstream enough to become standard fare in diners by the end of the 20th century, a type of restaurant that is now the most common in the region and the subject of the artist Edward Hopper.

In the past, this sort of establishment was a haven for the short-order cook, grilling or frying simple foods for the working man. Today typical service includes staples from this large region like beef on weck, Manhattan clam chowder, the club sandwich, Buffalo wings, Philadelphia cheesesteak, the black and white cookie, shoofly pie, snapper soup, Smith Island cake, blackout cake, grape pie, milkshakes, and the egg cream, a vanilla or chocolate fountain drink with a frothy top and fizzy taste.

As in Hopper's 1942 painting, many of these businesses are open 24 hours a day.

=== Midwest ===
This region encompasses the states adjascent to the Great Lakes and also the Great Plains; a significant portion of the area consists of prairie characterised by remarkably flat terrain. Winters are cold, windy, and wet. Midwestern cuisine is a highly eclectic, ranging from Kansas City–style barbecue to the Chicago-style hot dog, though many of its classics remain simple, hearty fare.

This region was mostly untouched by European and American settlers until after the American Revolutionary War, and excepting Missouri. The heavily forested states near the Great Lakes were mainly populated by nomadic tribes like the Sioux, Osage, Arapaho, and Cheyenne. As with most other American Indian tribes, these tribes consumed the Three Sisters of beans, maize, and squash, but also for thousands of years followed the herds of bison, hunting them on foot and later on horseback, typically using bow and arrow. There are buffalo jumps dating back nearly 10,000 years and several photographs and written accounts of trappers and homesteaders attesting to their dependence on the buffalo and, to a lesser degree, elk.

After nearly wiping out elk and bison, this region has taken to raising bison alongside cattle for their meat, at an enormous profit, turning them into burgers and steaks.

Often that means harsh blizzards, especially near the Great Lakes, where Arctic winds blow off of Canada, where ice on rivers and lakes freezes thick enough for ice hockey, and for ice fishing for pike, walleye, and panfish to be ubiquitous. In Minnesota, Wisconsin, and Michigan, they often become part of the local fish fry.

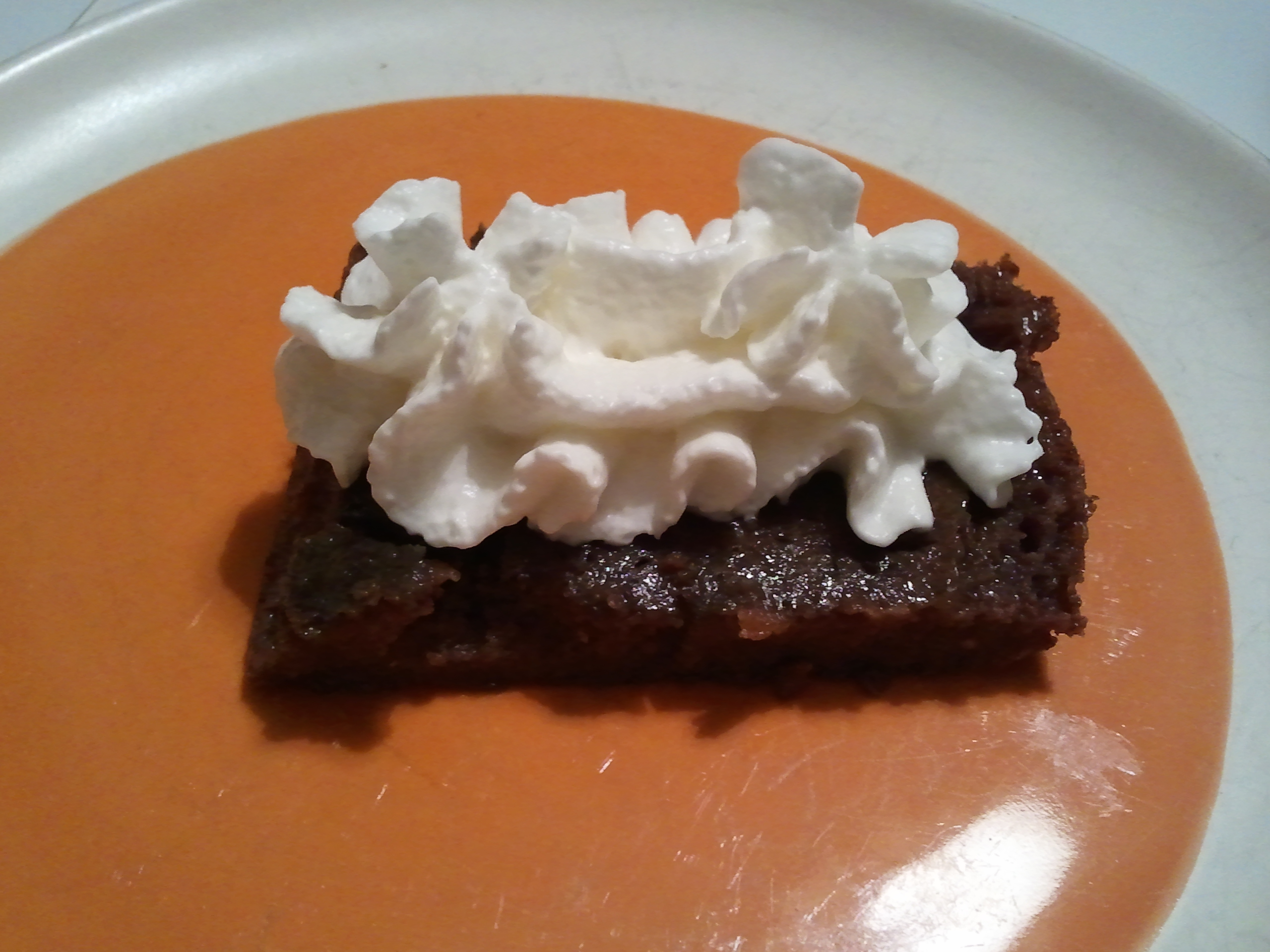
Persimmon pudding

The primary meats here are beef and poultry, since the Midwest has been raising turkeys, chickens, and geese for over 150 years. Chickens have been common for so long that the Midwest has several native breeds that are prized for both backyard farming and for farmers' markets, such as the Buckeye and Wyandotte. One, Billina, appears as a character in the second book of the Oz series by L. Frank Baum.

Favorite fruits of the region include native plants inherited from Native American tribes, such as the pawpaw, and American persimmons are also highly favored.

As in the American South, pawpaws are the region's largest native fruit, about the size of a mango, often found growing wild come September; they are made into preserves and cakes and command quite a price at farmers' markets in Chicago.

The American persimmon is often smaller than its Japanese cousin, about the size of a small plum, but in the Midwest and parts of the East, it is the main ingredient in the steamed persimmon pudding, topped with crème anglaise.

Other crops inherited from the Native Americans include wild rice, which grows along lake shores and is a local favorite for fancy meals; today it is often used in stuffing for Thanksgiving.

Typical fruits of the region are cold-weather crops. Once it was thought that its winters were too harsh for apples, but a breeder in Minnesota produced the Wealthy apple. It became the third-most productive region for apple growing in the country, with local varieties comprising Wolf River, Enterprise, Melrose, Paula Red, Rome Beauty, Honeycrisp, and the Red Delicious.

Cherries are important to Michigan and Wisconsin, which grow many cranberries, a legacy of early-19th-century emigration of New England farmers. Crabapple jelly is a favorite condiment of the region.

The influence of German, Scandinavian, and Slavic peoples on the northern portion of the region is very strong; many emigrated to Wisconsin, Minnesota, Michigan, Ohio, and Illinois in the 19th century to take advantage of jobs in the meatpacking industry and to become homesteaders and tradespeople.

Bratwurst is a very common sausage eaten at tailgate parties for the Green Bay Packers, Chicago Bears, or Detroit Lions, often served boiled in lager beer with sauerkraut, different from many of the recipes currently found in Germany.

Polish sausage, in particular a locally invented type of kielbasa, is essential for sporting events in Chicago: Chicago today has approximately 200,000 Polish speakers and has had a similar population for over 100 years.

When Poles came to Chicago and surrounding cities from Europe, they brought with them long ropes of kielbasa, cabbage rolls, and pierogi. Poles that left Poland after the fall of the Berlin Wall and descendants of earlier immigrants still make them, and they remain common in local diners and delis.

Today, alongside the pierogi, the sausage is served on a long roll with mustard, like a hot dog, or as a Maxwell Street Polish, a sandwich with caramelized onions. In Cleveland, the same sausage is served as the Polish boy, a sandwich made with French fries, spicy barbecue sauce, and coleslaw.

Unlike cities in the East where the hot dog alone is traditional, fans of the Cleveland Guardians (formerly the Cleveland Indians), Detroit Tigers, Chicago Cubs, Chicago White Sox, and Milwaukee Brewers favor two or three different kinds of sausage sold in the pushcarts outside the stadium.

The hot dogs themselves tend to follow the Chicago style, with mustard and pickled vegetables.

In Cincinnati, where the Cincinnati Reds play, there is a competitor in Cincinnati chili. Invented by Macedonian immigrants, it features spaghetti as its base, chili with a Mediterranean-inspired spice mix, and cheddar cheese; the chili itself is often used as a topping for local hot dogs at games.

In the Midwest and especially Minnesota, the tradition of the church potluck is a gathering where local foods reign, and has been since the era of the frontier; pioneers often needed to pool resources to celebrate in the 19th century and that never changed.

Nowhere is this clearer than with the hotdish, a type of casserole believed to have derived from a Norwegian recipe; it is usually topped with potatoes or tater tots. Next to the hotdish at potlucks, usually glorified rice is found, a kind of rice pudding mixed with crushed pineapple and maraschino cherries. Next to that is the booyah, a thick soup made of meat, vegetables, and seasonings that is meant to simmer on the stove for up to two days.

Lefse, traditionally a Scandinavian flatbread, has been handed down to descendants for over a hundred years and is common on the table. Behind that is venison, a popular meat around the Great Lakes and often eaten as steaks, sandwiches, and crown roasts for special events. Within Wisconsin, Minnesota and the Dakotas, tiger meat, a dish similar to steak tartare, is common.

Last on the table are the dessert bars and brownies, created in 1898 in Chicago, now a global food and an international favorite.

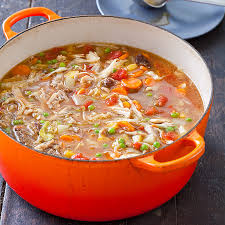
Booyah, a popular chunky stew of the Midwest that is often served to large numbers of people

Further south, barbecue has its own style in parts of Kansas City and St. Louis, distinct from the South and the American West. Kansas City and St. Louis were and are important hubs for the railroad that connected the plains with the Great Lakes and cities farther east, like Philadelphia.

At the turn of the 19th century, the St. Louis area, Omaha, and Kansas City had huge stockyards, waystations for cattle and pigs on their way east to the cities of the coast and north to the Great Lakes. They all had large growing immigrant and migrant populations from Europe and the South respectively, so the region has developed unique styles of barbecue.

St. Louis–style barbecue favors a heavy emphasis on a sticky-sweet barbecue sauce. Its standbys include the pork steak, a cut taken from the shoulder of the pig, grilled then slowly stewed in a pan over charcoal; crispy snoots, a cut from the cheek and nose of the pig that is fried up like cracklins and eaten dipped in sauce; pork spare ribs; and a mix of either beer-boiled bratwurst or grilled Italian sausage, flavored with fennel.

Dessert is usually something like gooey butter cake, invented in the city in the 1930s.

Kansas City–style barbecue uses several different kinds of meat, more than most styles of American barbecue—turkey, mutton, pork, and beef, to name a few—but is distinct from St. Louis in that the barbecue sauce adds molasses in with the tomato-based recipe and typically has a more tart taste.

Traditionally, Kansas City uses a low-and-slow method of smoking the meat in addition to just stewing it in the sauce. It also favors using hickory wood for smoking and continual watering or layering of the sauce while cooking to form a glaze; with burnt ends, this step is necessary to create the "bark" or charred outer layer of the brisket.

=== Southern United States ===
Chicken and waffles

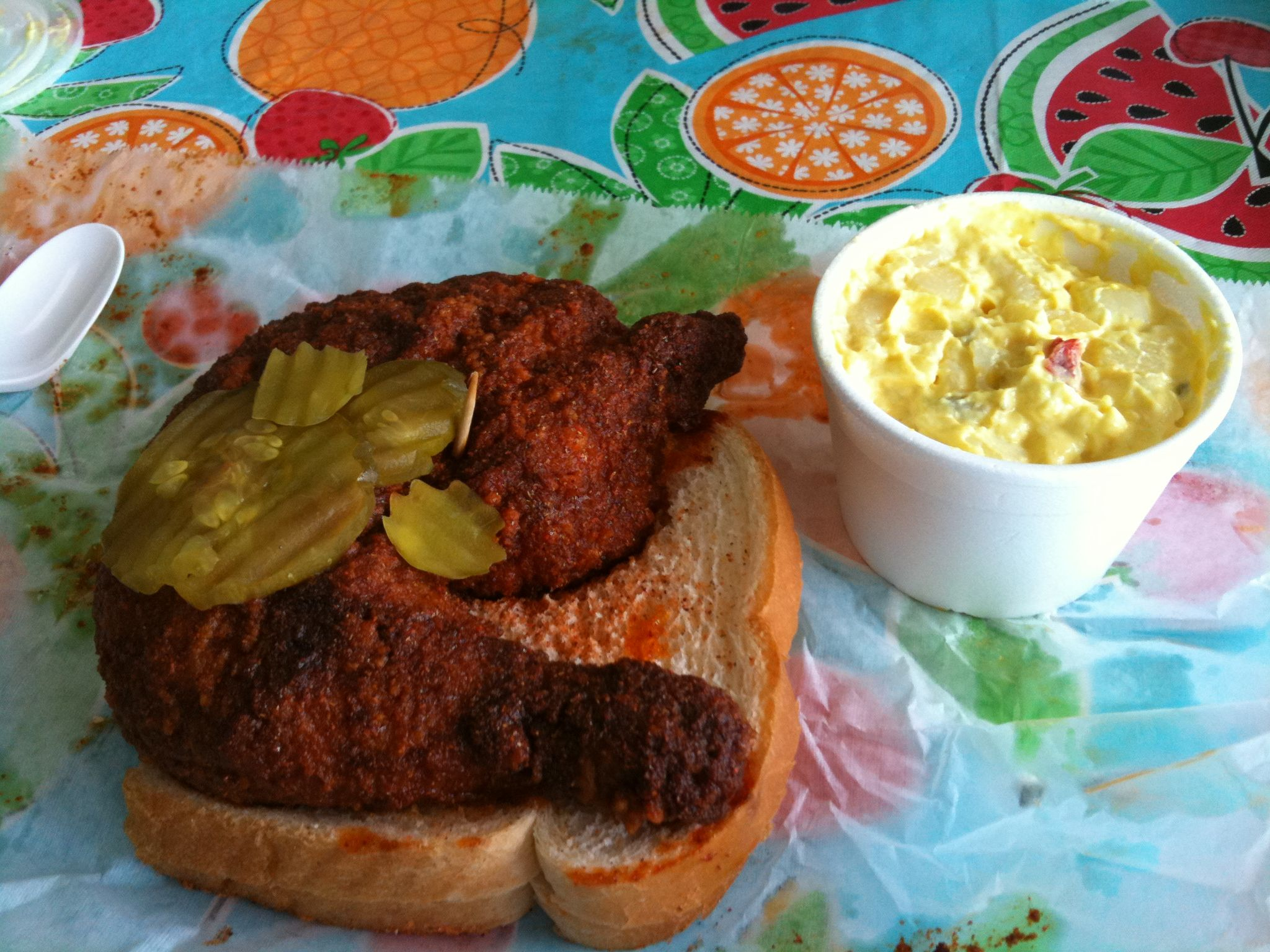
Nashville hot chicken with potato salad

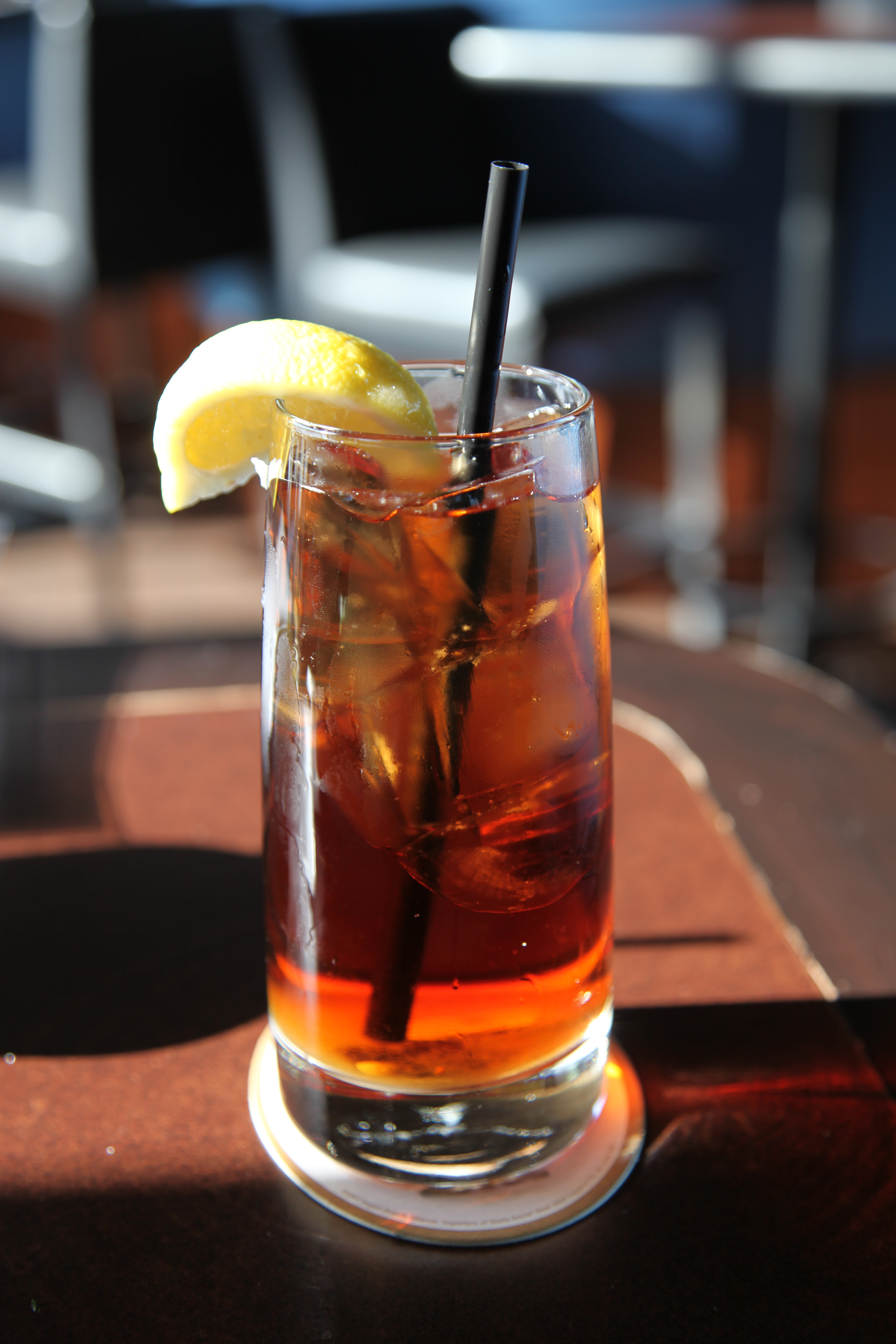
Sweet tea

When referring to the American South as a region, typically it should indicate Southern Maryland and the states that were once part of the Old Confederacy, with the dividing line between the East and West jackknifing about 100 miles west of Dallas, Texas, and mostly south of the old Mason–Dixon line. Cities found in this area include New Orleans, Atlanta, Washington, D.C., Memphis, Charleston, and Charlotte with Houston, Texas being the largest. The Florida Panhandle is usually considered part of the South, but the Florida peninsula (especially its lower half) is not.

These states are much more closely tied to each other and have been part of U.S. territory for much longer than states much farther west than East Texas. In the case of food, the influences and cooking styles are strictly separated as the terrain shifts from bayou and hardwood forest to prairie and desert.

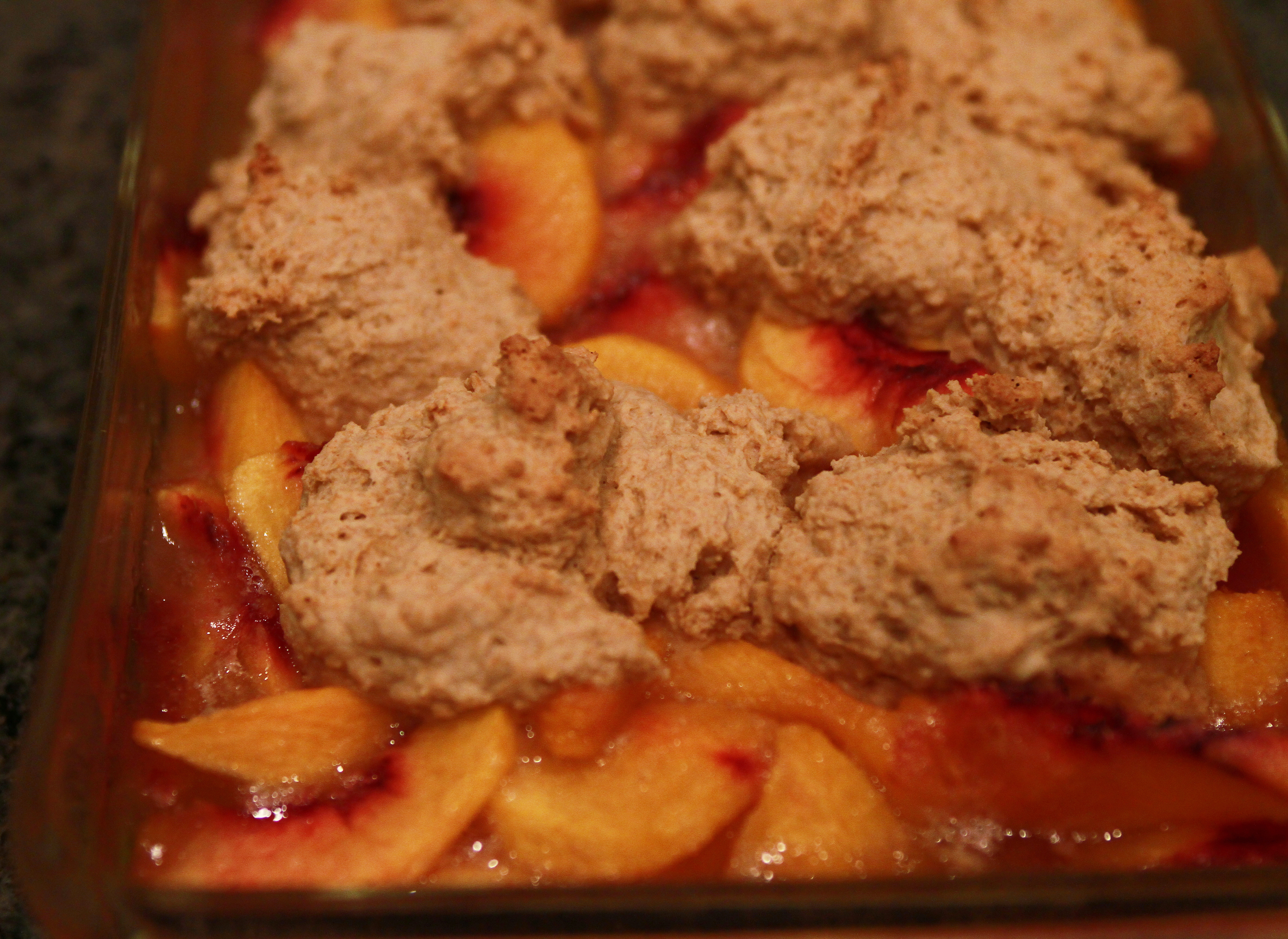
Peach cobbler is a popular Southern dessert.

This section of the country has some of the oldest known U.S. foodways, with recipes dating back almost 400 years.

Native American influences are still quite visible in the use of cornmeal as an essential staple and found in the Southern predilection for hunting wild game, in particular wild turkey, deer, woodcock, and various kinds of waterfowl; for example, coastal North Carolina is a place where hunters will seek tundra swan as a part of Christmas dinner; the original English and Scottish settlers would have rejoiced at this revelation since such was banned among the commoner class in what is now the United Kingdom, and naturally, their descendants have not forgotten.

Native Americans also consumed turtles and catfish, specifically the snapping turtle, the alligator snapping turtle, and blue catfish. Catfish are often caught with one's bare hands, gutted, breaded, and fried to make a Southern variation on English fish and chips, and turtles are turned into stews and soups.

Native American tribes of the region, such as the Cherokee or Choctaw, often cultivated or gathered local plants like pawpaw, maypop, and several sorts of squashes and corn as food. They also used spicebush and sassafras as spices, and the aforementioned fruits are still cultivated as food in the South.

Maize is to this day found in dishes for breakfast, lunch and dinner in the form of grits, hoecakes, baked cornbread, and spoonbread, and nuts like the hickory, black walnut and pecan are commonly included in desserts and pastries as varied as mince pies, pecan pie, pecan rolls and honey buns (both are types of sticky bun), and quick breads, which were themselves invented in the South during the American Civil War.

Peaches have been grown in this region since the 17th century and are a staple crop and a favorite fruit, with peach cobbler a signature dessert.

==== Early history ====
European influence began soon after the settlement of Jamestown in 1607, and the earliest recipes emerged by the end of the 17th century. Specific influences from Europe were quite varied, and they remain traditional and essential to modern cookery overall.

German speakers often settled in the Piedmont on small farms from the coast. They invented an American delicacy that is now nationally beloved, apple butter, based on their recipe for apfelkraut, and later they introduced red cabbage and rye.

From the British Isles, an enormous amount of influence was bestowed upon the South, specifically foodways from 17th- and 18th-century Ulster, the borderlands between England and Scotland, the Scottish Highlands, portions of Wales, the West Midlands, the West Country, Black Country and Southern England. Settlers bound for America fled the tumult of the Civil War, Ulster, and the Highland Clearances.

Often, ships' manifests show their belongings included nearly always cookpots or bakestones and seed stock for plants like peaches, plums, and apples, to grow orchards which they planted in their hundreds. Each group brought foods and ideas from their respective regions.

Settlers from Ireland and Scotland were well known for creating peatreak and poitín, strong, hard liquor based on fermenting potatoes or barley. In time, they came up with a method for distilling a corn mash with added sugar and aging in charred barrels made of select hardwoods, which created a whiskey with a high proof. This gave birth to American whiskey and Kentucky bourbon, and its cousins moonshine and Everclear.

Closer to the coast, 18th-century recipes for English trifle turned into tipsy cakes, replacing the sherry with whiskey and their recipe for pound cake, brought to the South around the same time, still works with American baking units: one pound sugar, one pound eggs, one pound butter, one pound flour.

==== Common features ====
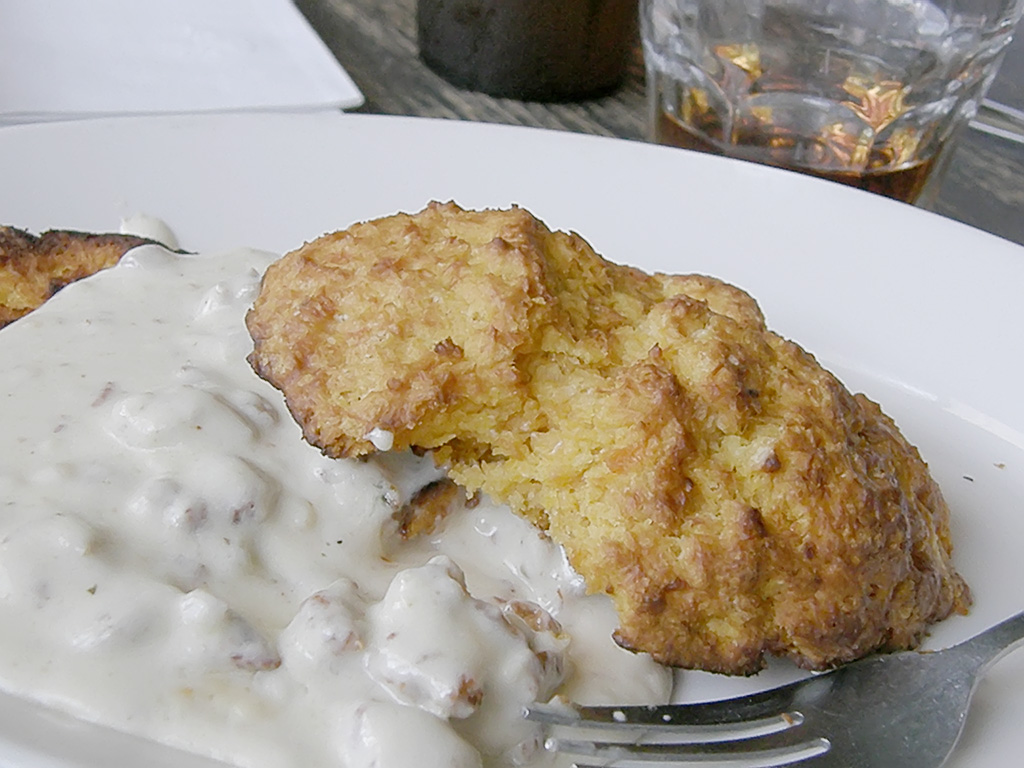
Biscuits and gravy

Pork is the popular choice in 80% of Southern-style barbecue and also features in other preparations such as sausages and sandwiches. For most Southerners in the antebellum period, corn and pork were staples of the diet. Country sausage is an ingredient in the Southern breakfast dish of biscuits and gravy. Country ham is often served for breakfast and cured with salt or sugar and hickory-smoked.

Accompanying many meals is the southern-style fluffy biscuit, in which the leavening agent is baking powder, and it often includes buttermilk. For breakfast, they often accompany country ham, grits, and scrambled eggs.

==== Desserts ====
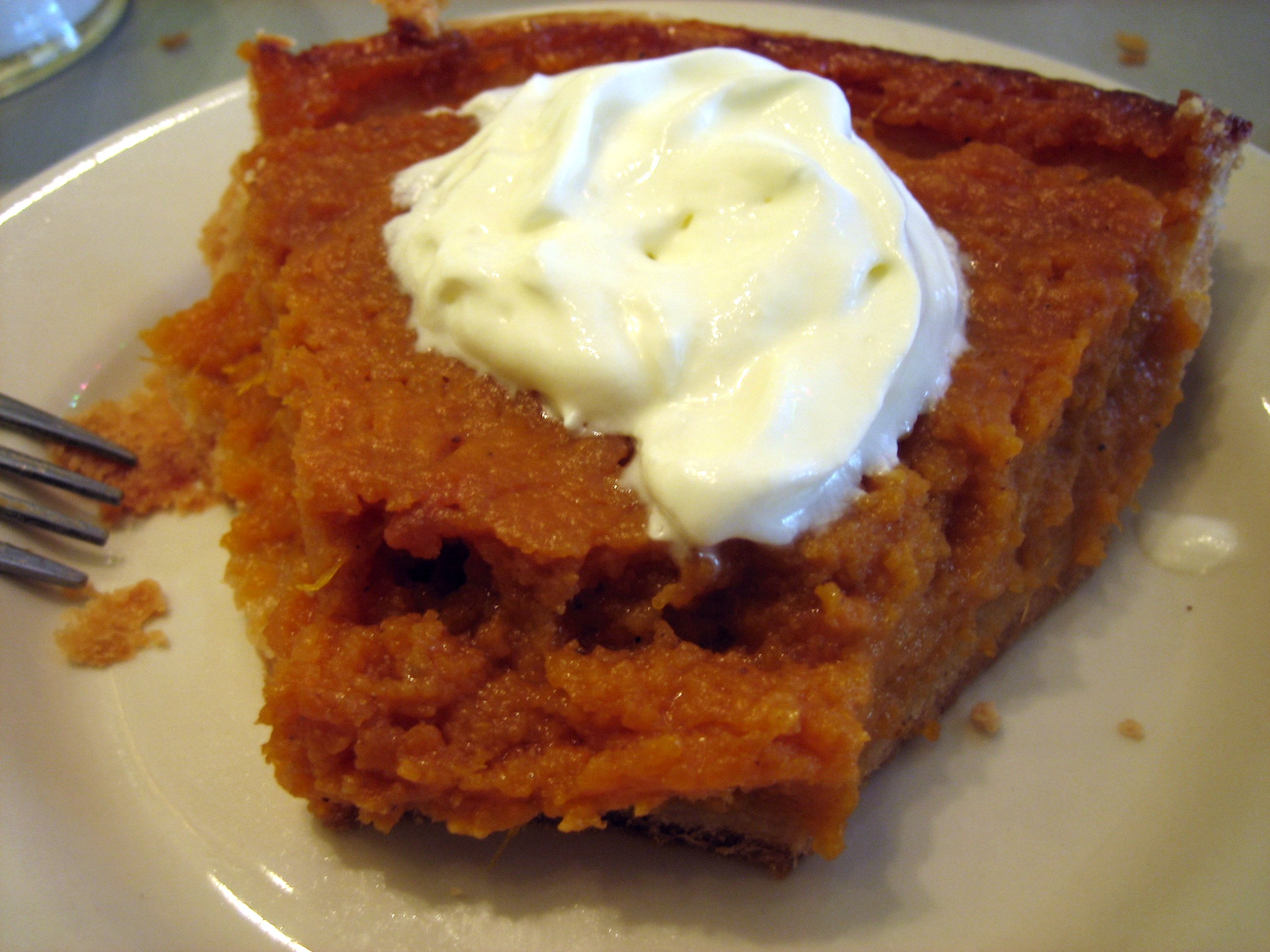
Sweet potato pie

Desserts in the South depict a legacy of entertaining to impress guests, since stereotypically, a Southern housewife was (and to a degree still is) expected to show her hospitality by laying out as impressive a banquet as she can manage.

Desserts are vast and encompass Lane cake, sweet potato pie, peach cobbler, pecan pie, hummingbird cake, Jefferson Davis pie, peanut brittle, coconut cake, apple fritters, peanut cookies, Moravian spice cookies, chess pie, doberge cake, Lady Baltimore cake, bourbon balls, and caramel cake.

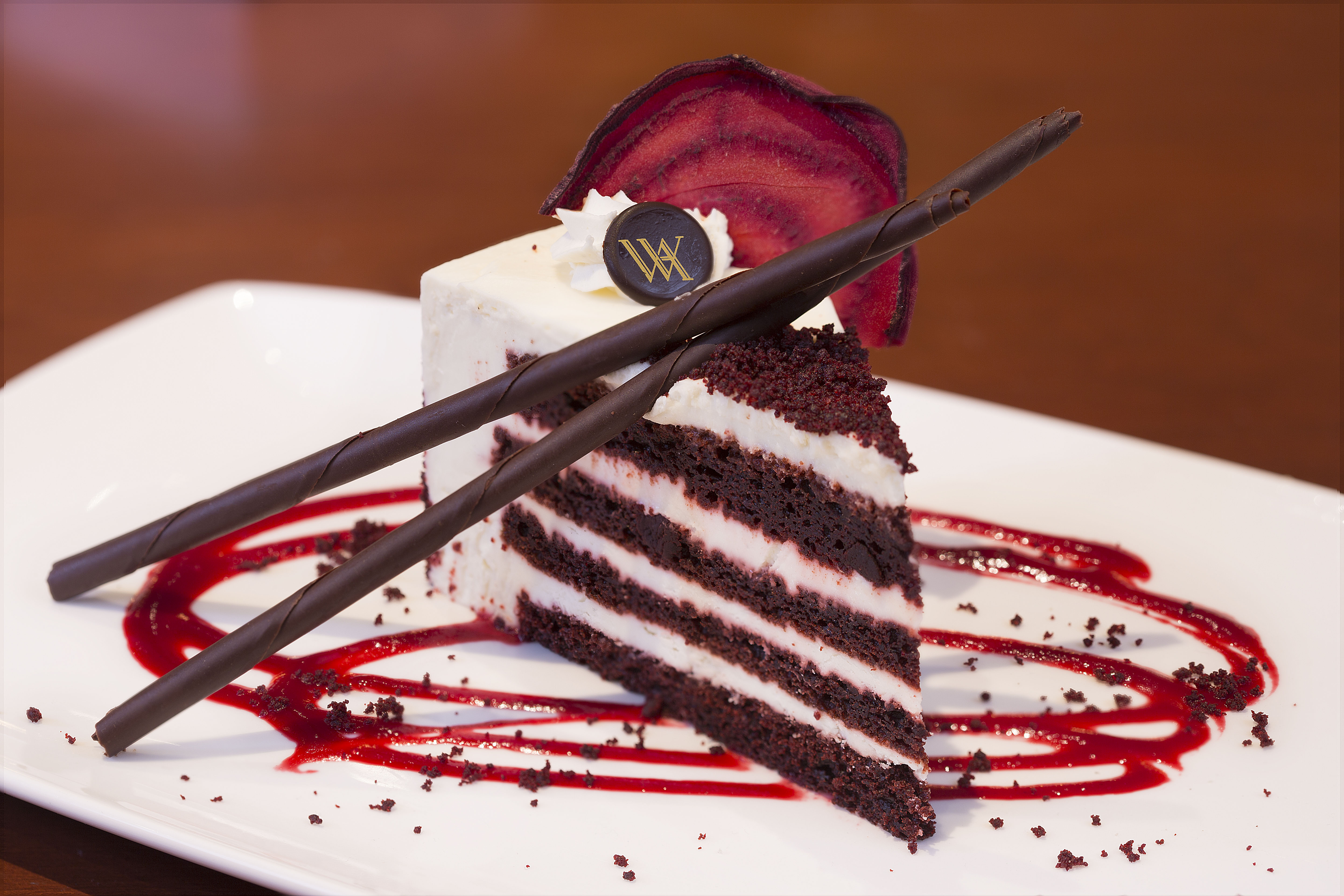
Red velvet cake

American-style sponge cakes tend to be the rule rather than the exception, as is American buttercream, a place where Southern baking intersects with the rest of the United States. Nuts like pecans and hickory nuts are often used as garnishes for these desserts, and they make their way into local bakeries as fillings for chocolates.

==== Cajun and Creole cuisine of Louisiana ====
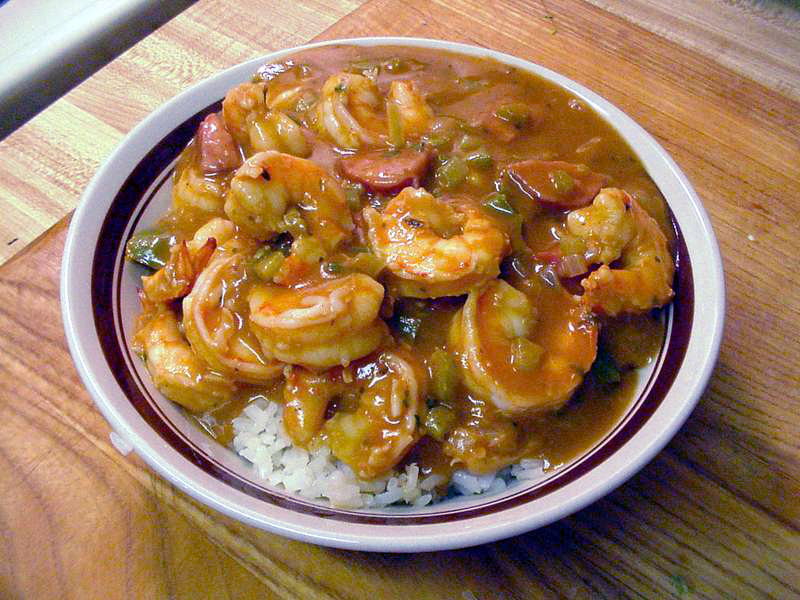
Shrimp gumbo is a popular Cajun and Creole dish.

In Louisiana, cooking methods have more in common with rustic French cuisines of the 17th and 18th century than anything ever found at the French court in Versailles or the bistros of 19th- and 20th-century Paris; this is especially true of Cajun cuisine.

Cajun French is more closely related to dialects spoken in Northern Maine, New Brunswick, and to a lesser degree Haiti than anything spoken in modern France, and likewise their terminology, methodology, and culture concerning food is much more closely related to the styles of these former French colonies even today.

Unlike other areas of the South, Cajuns were and still are largely Catholics and thus much of what they eat is seasonal; for example, pork is an important component of the Cajun boucherie (a large community event where the hog is butchered, prepared with a fiery spice mix, and eaten snout to tail). Still, it is never consumed in the five weeks of Lent, when such would be forbidden.

Cajun cuisine tends to focus on what is locally available, historically because Cajuns were often poor, illiterate, independent farmers and not plantation owners, but today it is because such is deeply embedded in local culture.

Boudin is a type of sausage found only in this area of the country, and it is often by far more spicy than anything found in France or Belgium. Chaudin is unique to the area, and the method of cooking is comparable to the Scottish dish haggis: the stuffing includes onions, rice, bell peppers, spices, and pork sewn up in the stomach of a pig, and served in slices piping hot.

Crawfish are a staple of the Cajun grandmother's cookpot, as they are abundant in the bayous of Southern Louisiana and a main source of livelihood, as are blue crabs, shrimp, corn on the cob, and red potatoes, since these are the basic ingredients of the Louisiana crawfish boil.

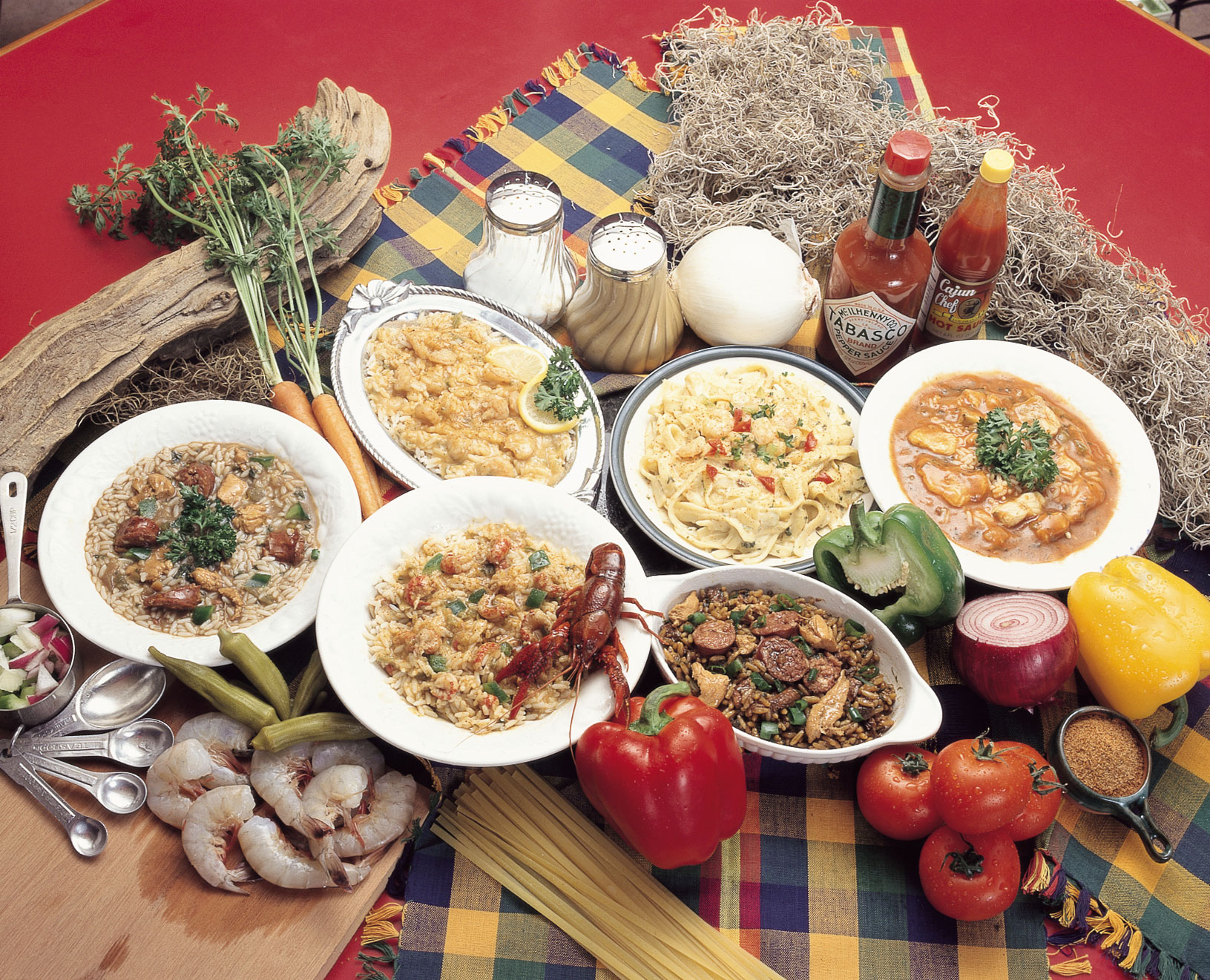
Dishes typical of Louisiana Creole cuisine

New Orleans has been the capital of Creole culture since before Louisiana was a state. This culture is that of the colonial French and Spanish, which evolved in the city of New Orleans, which was, and still is, quite distinct from the rural culture of Cajuns and dovetails with what was eaten in antebellum Louisiana plantation culture.

Cooking to impress and show one's wealth was a staple of Creole culture, which often mixed French, Spanish, Italian, German, African, Caribbean, and Native American cooking methods, producing rich dishes like oysters bienville, pompano en papillote, and even the muffaletta sandwich.

However, Louisiana Creole cuisine tends to diverge from the original ideas brought to the region in ingredients: profiteroles, for example, use a near identical choux pastry to that which is found in modern Paris but often use vanilla or chocolate ice cream rather than custard as the filling, pralines nearly always use pecan and not almonds, and bananas foster came about when New Orleans was a key port for the import of bananas from the Caribbean Sea.

Gumbos tend to be thickened with okra, or the leaves of the sassafrass tree. Andouille is often used, but not the andouille currently known in France, since French andouille uses tripe, whereas Louisiana andouille is made from a Boston butt, usually inflected with pepper flakes, and smoked for hours over pecan wood.

Other ingredients native to Louisiana and not found in modern French cuisine include rice, a staple of both Creole and Cajun cooking for generations, and sugarcane, which has been grown in Louisiana since the early 1800s.

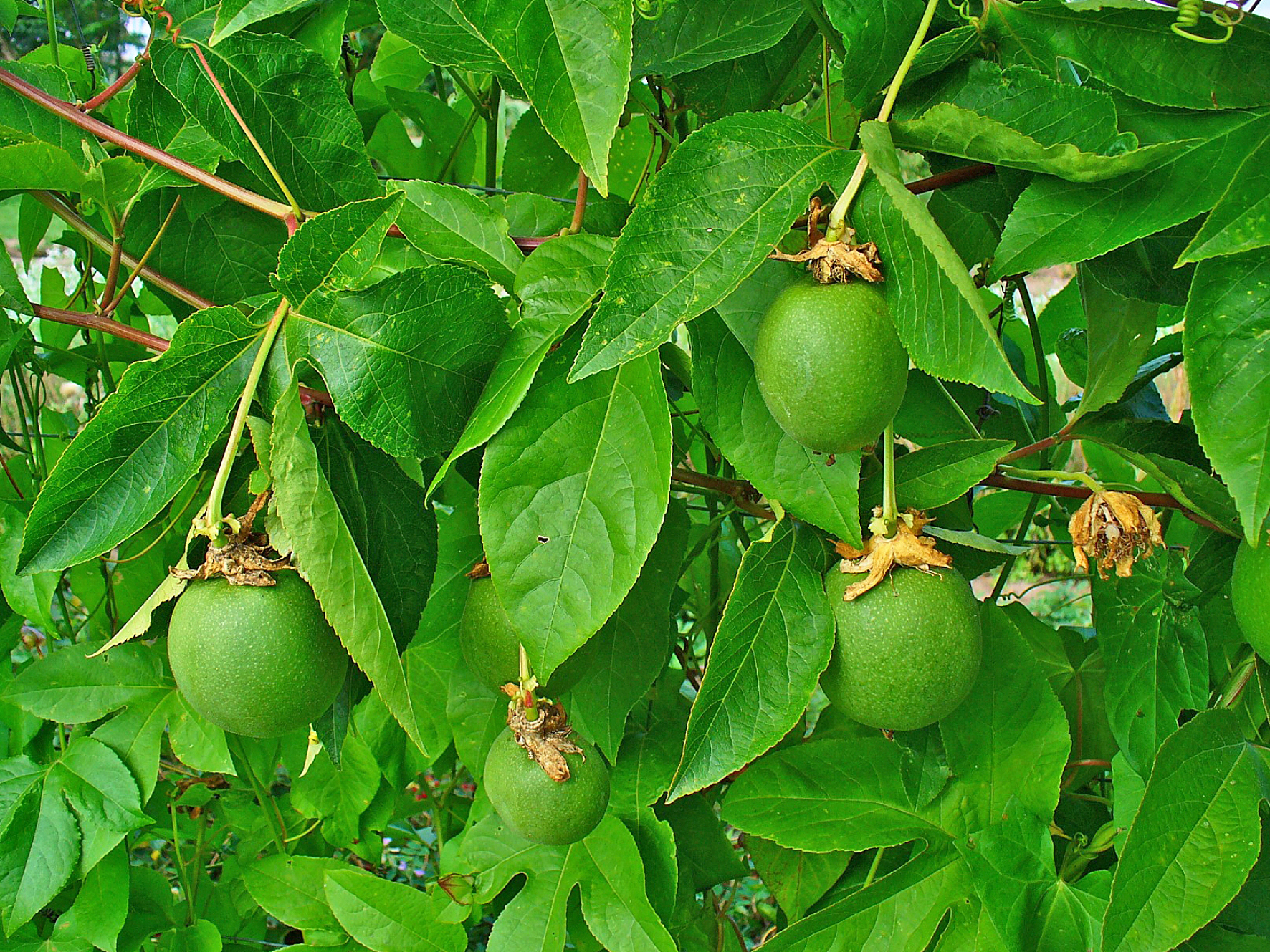
The maypop plant

Ground cayenne pepper is a key spice of the region, as is the meat of the American alligator, something settlers learned from the Choctaws and Houma. The maypop plant has been a favorite of Southerners for 350 years; it gives its name to the Ocoee River in Tennessee, a legacy of the Cherokees, and in Southern Louisiana, it is known as liane de grenade, indicating its consumption by Cajuns. It is a close relative of the commercial passionfruit, similar in size, and is a common plant growing in gardens all over the South as a source of fresh summertime fruit.

==== African American influences ====
West African influences came with enslaved peoples from Ghana, Benin, Mali, Congo, Angola, Sierra Leone, Nigeria, and other portions of the Gold Coast, and the mark Africans and their descendants, the African Americans, have made on Southern food is strong today and an essential addition to the Southern table.

Crops like okra, sorghum, sesame seeds, eggplant, and many different kinds of melons were brought with them from West Africa along with the introduction of rice to the Carolinas and later to Texas and Louisiana, whence it became a staple grain of that region and remains a staple in those areas today, found in dishes like Hoppin John, purloo, and Charleston red rice.

Like the poorer indentured servants that came to the South, enslaved people often got the leftovers of what was slaughtered for the consumption of their enslavers; many recipes had to be adapted for offal, like pig's ears and fatback. However, other methods encouraged low-and-slow cooking to tenderize tougher cuts of meat, such as braising, smoking, and pit roasting, the last of which was a method known to West Africans in the preparation of roasted goat.

Peanut soup is one of the oldest known recipes brought to Virginia by Africans, and, over time, through their descendants, it has become creamier and milder-tasting than the original.

==== Florida cuisine ====
Certain portions of the South often have their own distinct culinary subtypes owing to local history and landscape. Floridian cuisine, for example, has a distinct cooking style that features a range of ingredients, especially south of Tampa and in Orlando.

Spain controlled the state until the early 19th century and, beginning in the 1500s, used the southern tip as an outpost to guard the Spanish Main. Florida kept and still maintains ties with the Caribbean Sea, including the Bahamas, Haiti, Cuba, Puerto Rico, the Dominican Republic, and Jamaica.

South of Tampa, there are and have been for a long time many speakers of Caribbean Spanish, Haitian French, Jamaican Patois, and Haitian Creole, and each Caribbean culture has a strong hold on cooking methods and spices in Florida. In turn, each mixes and matches with the foodways of the Seminole tribe and Anglophone settlers. Thus, for almost 200 years, Floridian cooking has had a more tropical flavor than any other Southern state.

Allspice, a spice originally from Jamaica, is an ingredient found in spice mixes in summer barbecues along with ginger, garlic, scotch bonnet peppers, sea salt, and nutmeg; in Floridian cooking this is often a variant of Jamaican jerk spice. Coconuts are grown in the areas surrounding Miami and are shipped daily through its port for the consumption of coconut milk, meat, and water.

Bananas are not just the yellow Cavendish variety found in supermarkets across America: in Florida, they are available as bananitos, colorados, plátanos, and maduros. The first of these is a tiny banana, only about 4–5 inches (10–13 cm) long, and it is sweet. The second has a red peel and an apple-like aftertaste, and the third and fourth are used as a starch on nearly every Caribbean island as a side dish, baked or fried: all of the above are staples of Florida outdoor markets when in season, and all have been grown in the Caribbean for almost 400 years.

Mangoes are grown as a backyard plant in Southern Florida and otherwise are a favorite treat coming in many different shapes and sizes, from Nam Doc Mai, brought to Florida after the Vietnam War, to Madame Francis, a mango from Haiti. Sweetsop and soursop are popular around Miami, but nearly unheard of in other areas of the South.

Citrus is a major crop in Florida and features on many breakfast tables and in many markets, with the height of the season near the first week of January. Hamlin oranges are the main cultivar planted, and from this crop, the rest of the United States and, to a lesser extent, Europe get orange juice. Other plantings include grapefruits, tangerines, clementines, limes, and even a few more rare ones, like Cara Cara navel oranges, tangelos, and the Jamaican Ugli fruit. Tomatoes, bell peppers, habanero peppers, and figs, especially taken from the Florida strangler fig, complete the produce menu.

Blue crab, conch, Florida stone crab, red drum, dorado, and marlins tend to be local favorite ingredients. Dairy is available in this region, but it is less emphasized due to the year-round warmth.

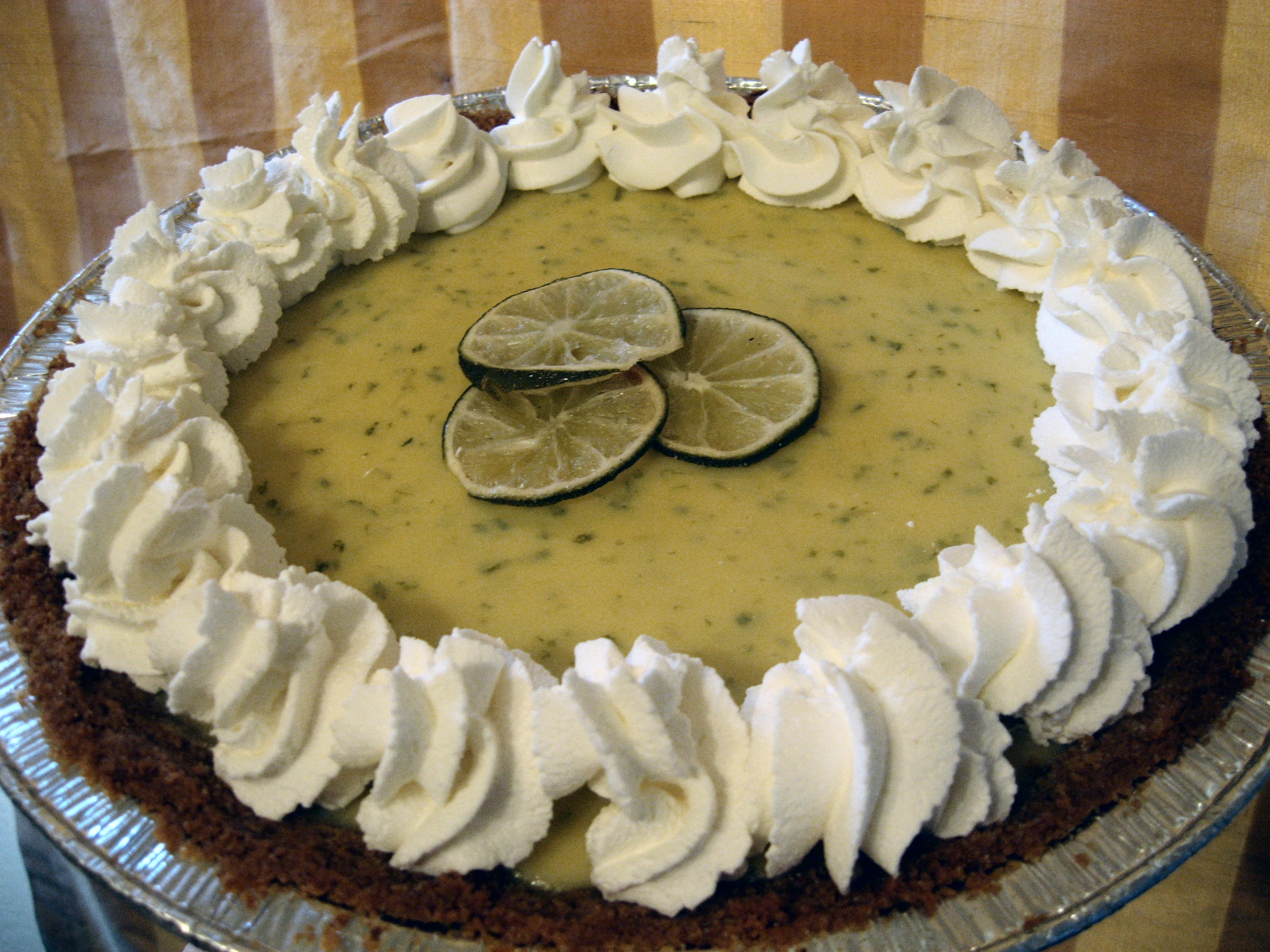
Key lime pie

Traditional key lime pie, a dessert from the islands off the coast of Miami, is made with condensed milk to form the custard with the eye-wateringly tart limes native to the Florida Keys in part because milk would spoil in an age before refrigeration.

Pork in this region tends to be roasted in methods similar to those found in Puerto Rico and Cuba, owing to mass emigration from those countries in the 20th century, especially in the counties surrounding Miami.

Orange blossom honey is a specialty of the state and is widely available in farmers' markets. Caribbean lobster is a favorite special meal eagerly sought after by Floridians as it is found as far north as Fort Myers: spear diving and collecting them from reefs in the Florida Keys and near rocky shoals is a common practice of local scuba divers.

==== Other small game ====
Ptarmigan, grouse, crow, blackbirds, dove, duck, and other game fowl are consumed in the United States. In the American state of Arkansas, beaver tail stew is consumed in Cotton town. Squirrel, raccoon, possum, bear, muskrat, chipmunk, skunk, groundhog, pheasant, armadillo and rabbit are also consumed in the United States.

=== Cuisine in the West ===
Cooking in the American West draws on Native American and Hispanophone cultures, as well as later 19th-century settlers: Texas, for example, has some German influence in its barbecue, which uses sausages.

Another instance can be found in the Northwestern region, which encompasses Oregon, Washington, and Northern California. All of the aforementioned rely on local seafood and a few of their own classics.

In New Mexico, Colorado, Nevada, Arizona, Utah, West Texas, and Southern California, Mexican flavors and influences are extremely common, especially from the Mexican states of Chihuahua, Baja California, and Sonora.

==== Northwest ====
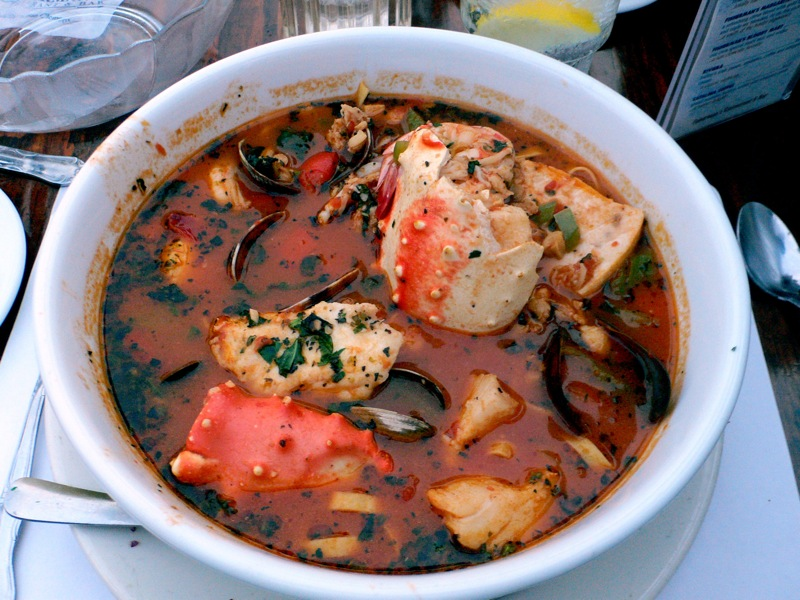
Cioppino

The Pacific Northwest as a region includes Alaska and the state of Washington near the Canada-US border and terminates near Sacramento, California and the San Francisco Bay Area of Northern California, and for culinary purposes includes the historic influence of the Monterey Bay area. Here, the terrain is mostly temperate rainforest on the coast, mixed with pine forest as one approaches the Canada-US border inland.

One of the core favorite foodstuffs is Pacific salmon, native to many of the area's larger rivers and often smoked or grilled on cedar planks. In Alaska, wild game like ptarmigan and moose meat is featured extensively, since much of the state is wilderness.

Fresh fish like steelhead trout, Pacific cod, Pacific halibut, and pollock are fished for extensively and feature on the menu of many restaurants, as do a plethora of fresh berries and vegetables, like Cameo apples from Washington state, the headquarters of the U.S. apple industry, cherries from Oregon, blackberries, and marionberries, a feature of many pies. Hazelnuts are grown extensively in this region; they are a feature of baking, such as in chocolate hazelnut pie, an Oregon favorite, and Almond Roca is a local candy.

Like its counterpart on the opposite coast to the East, there is a grand variety of shellfish in this region. Geoducks are a native species of giant clam with incredibly long necks; they are eaten by the bucketful and shipped to Asia for millions of dollars because they are believed to be an aphrodisiac. Gaper clams are a favorite food, often grilled or steamed in a sauce.

Native California abalone is protected as a food source, and a traditional foodway predating settlement by whites, today featuring heavily in the cooking of fine restaurants as well as in home cooking, in mirin-flavored soups (the influence of Japanese cooking is strong in the region), noodle dishes, and on the barbecue.

Native Olympia oysters are served on the half-shell, as are the Kumamoto oyster, introduced by Japanese immigrants and a staple at dinner as an appetizer.

California mussels are a delicacy of the region, and have been a feature of the cooking for generations. There is evidence that Native American tribes consumed them up and down the California coast for centuries.

Crabs are a delicacy, and included in this are Alaskan king crab, red crab, yellow crab, and Dungeness crab. Californian and Oregonian crabbers pursue the last three extensively using hoop nets and prepare them in a multitude of ways.

Alaskan king crab, able to grow as large as 10 kg, is often served steamed for a whole table with lemon-butter sauce or put in chunks of salad with avocado, and native crabs are the base of dishes like the California roll, cioppino, a tomato-based fisherman's stew, and Crab Louie, another kind of salad native to San Francisco.

Favorite grains are mainly wheat, and the region is known for sourdough bread. Cheeses of the region include Humboldt Fog, Monterey Jack, Cougar Gold and Teleme.

==== Southwest and Southern California ====
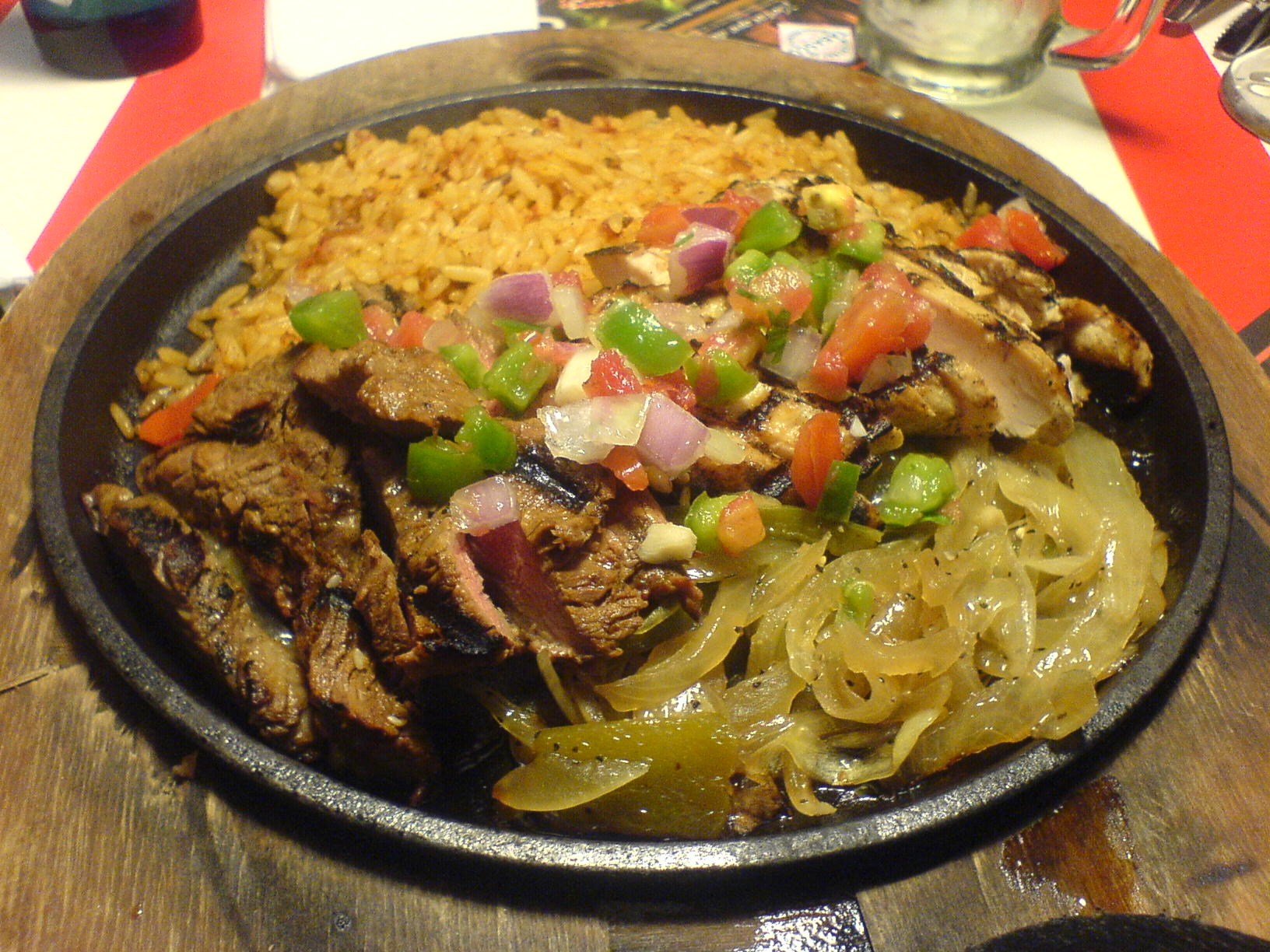
Mixed beef and chicken fajita ingredients, served on a hot iron skillet

The states of the Four Corners (Arizona, New Mexico, Colorado, and Utah) plus Nevada, Southern California, and West Texas make up a large chunk of the United States.

There is a distinct Hispanic accent to the cookery here, with each having cultural capitals in Albuquerque, Denver, Las Vegas, Los Angeles, Phoenix, Santa Fe, San Diego, and Tucson.

For centuries, prior to California's statehood in the 1850s, it was part of the Spanish Empire, namely Alta California (modern California), Santa Fe de Nuevo México (modern New Mexico), and Tejas (modern Texas). Today, it is home to a large population of Native Americans, Hispanos, descendants of the American frontier, Asian Americans, and immigrants from Mexico and Latin America.

California, New Mexico, and Texas continue to maintain their unique identities, reflected in their distinct regional cuisines: the multiple cuisines of California, New Mexican cuisine, Texan cuisine, and Tex-Mex. Spanish is a commonly spoken secondary language here; the state of New Mexico has its own distinct dialect.

With the exception of Southern California, the signature meat is beef, since this is one of the two regions in which cowboys lived and modern cattle ranchers still eke out their living today. High-quality beefstock is a feature that has been present in the region for more than 200 years and the many cuts of beef are unique to the United States. These cuts of meat differ from those in related Mexican cuisine on the border in that certain kinds of offal, like lengua (tongue), cabeza (head), and tripas (tripe), are considered less desirable and thus less emphasized. Typical cuts would include the ribs, brisket, sirloin, flank steak, skirt steak, and t-bone.

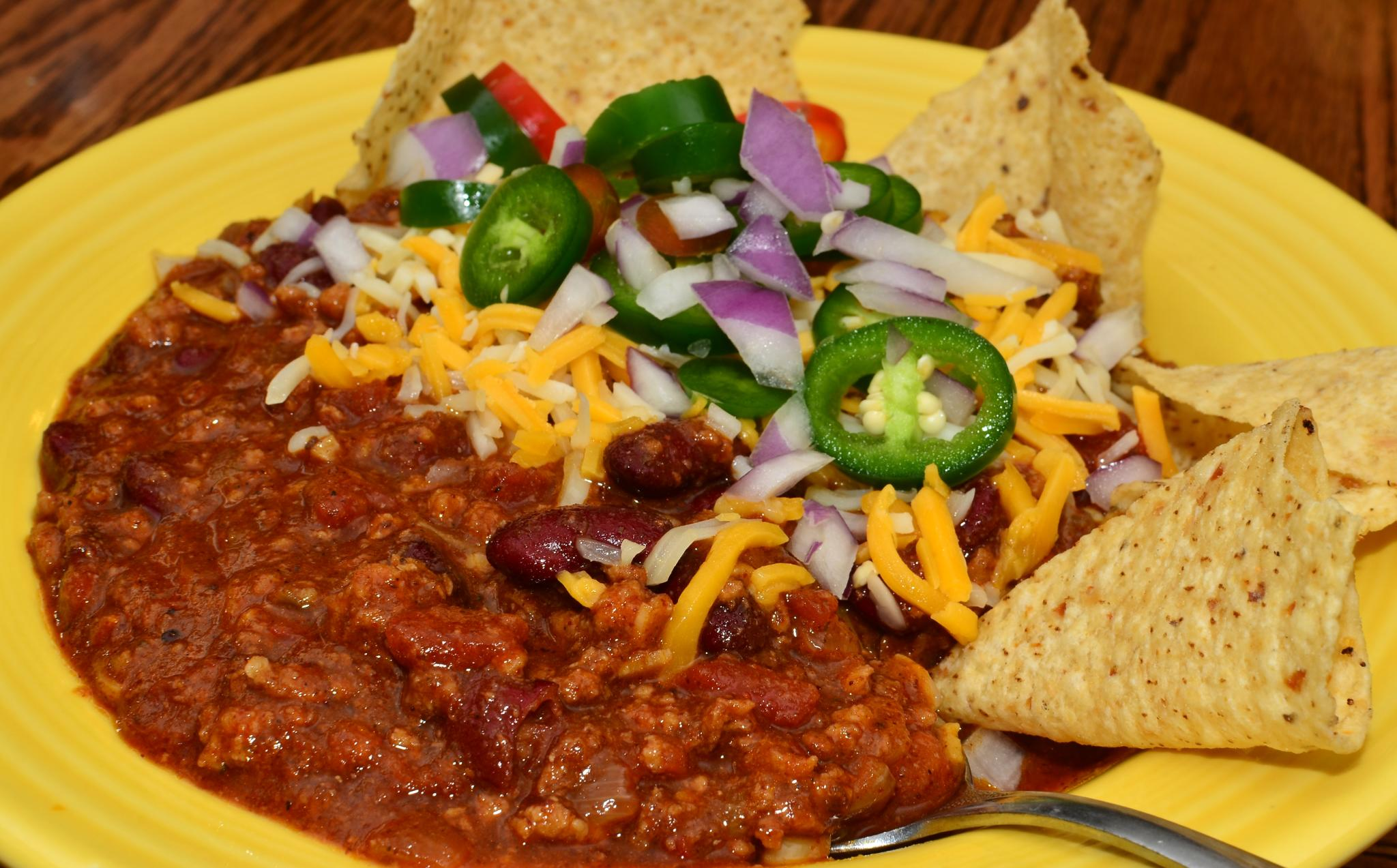
Chili con carne, a typical Tex-Mex dish with garnishes and tortilla chips

Historically, Spanish settlers who came to the region found it completely unsuitable for the mining operations that much older settlements in Mexico had to offer, as their technology was not advanced enough to extract the silver that would later be found. They did not know the gold in California, which would not be found until 1848, and knew even less about the silver in Nevada, which would not be discovered until after the American Civil War.

Instead, to make the pueblos prosper, they adapted the old rancho system of places like Andalusia in Spain and brought the earliest beefstock, among these were breeds that would go feral and become the Texas longhorn, and Navajo-Churro sheep, still used as breeding stock because they are easy to keep and well adapted to the extremely arid and hot climate, where temperatures easily exceed 38 °C.

Later, cowboys learned from their management practices, many of which still stand today, like the practical management of stock on horseback using the Western saddle.

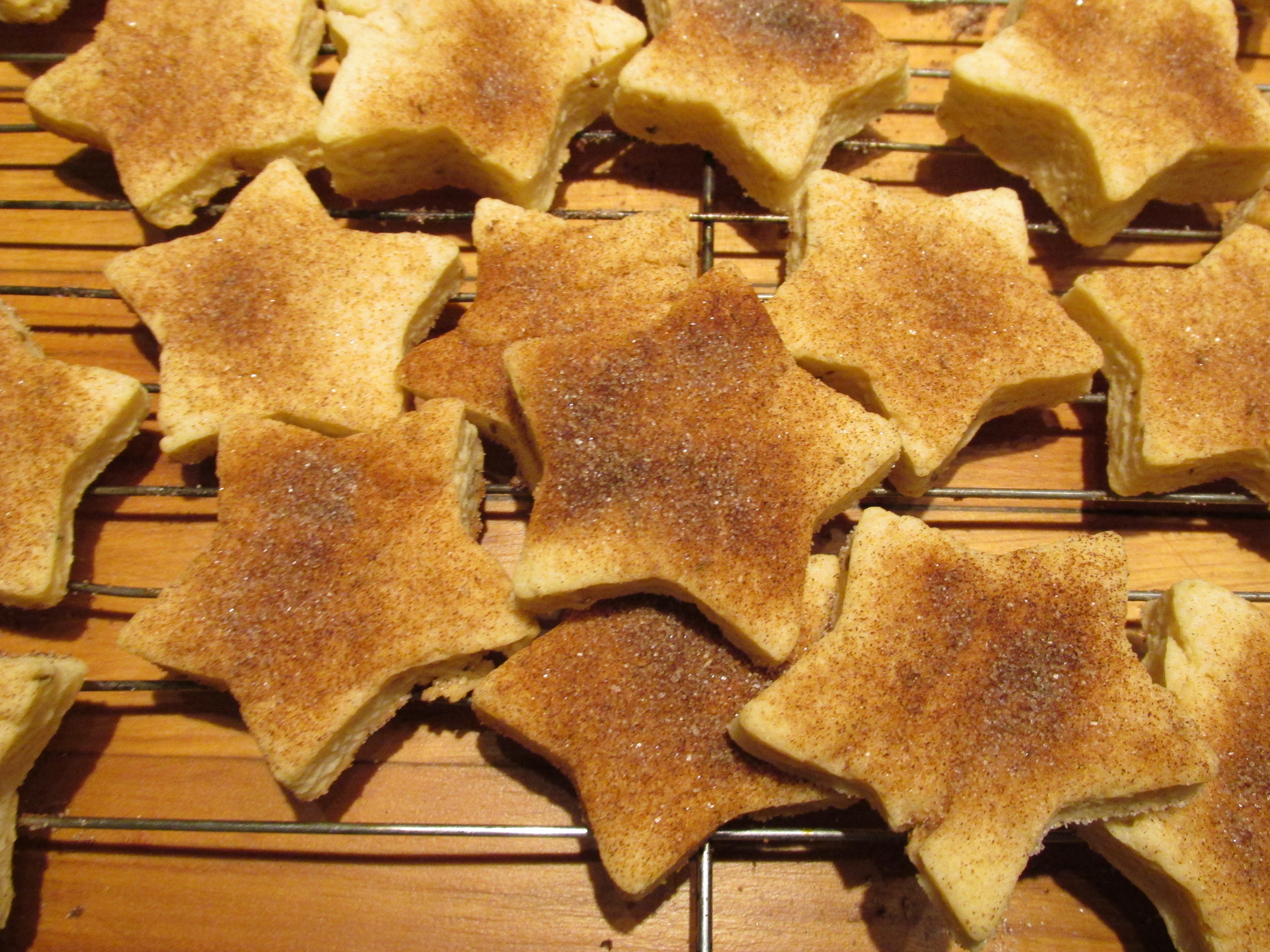
Biscochitos, the state cookie of New Mexico

Likewise, settlers learned the cooking methods of those who came before and local tribes as well, for example, portions of Arizona and New Mexico still use the aforementioned beehive shaped clay contraption called an horno, an outdoor wood-fired oven both Native American tribes like the Navajo and Spaniards used for roasting meat, maize, and baking bread.

Meats that see frequent use include elk meat, a favorite in crown roasts and burgers, and, nearer the Mexican border, rattlesnake, often skinned and stewed.

The taste for alcohol tends toward light and clean flavors found in tequila, a staple of this region since the days of the Wild West and a staple in the bartender's arsenal for cocktails, especially in Las Vegas. In Utah, a state heavily populated by Mormons, alcohol is frowned upon by the Church of Jesus Christ of Latter-day Saints but still available in area bars in Salt Lake City, mainly consumed by the populations of Catholics and other Protestant denominations living there.

Introduction of agriculture was limited before the 20th century; the development of better irrigation techniques, but included the addition of peaches, a crop still celebrated by Native American tribes like the Havasupai, and oranges. Today in Arizona, Texas, and New Mexico the favored orange today is the Moro blood orange, which often finds its way into the local cuisine, like cakes and marmalade.

Pine nuts are a particular regional specialty and feature often in fine dining and cookies; in Nevada, the Native American tribes that live there are by treaty given rights to exclusive harvest, and in New Mexico, they reserve usage of the term piñon for certain species of indigenous pine nuts.

From Native Americans, Westerners learned to eat cactus fruit from the myriad species of opuntia that occupy the Chihuahuan, Sonoran, and Mojave desert lands. In California, Spanish missionaries brought the mission fig with them, and today this fruit is a delicacy.

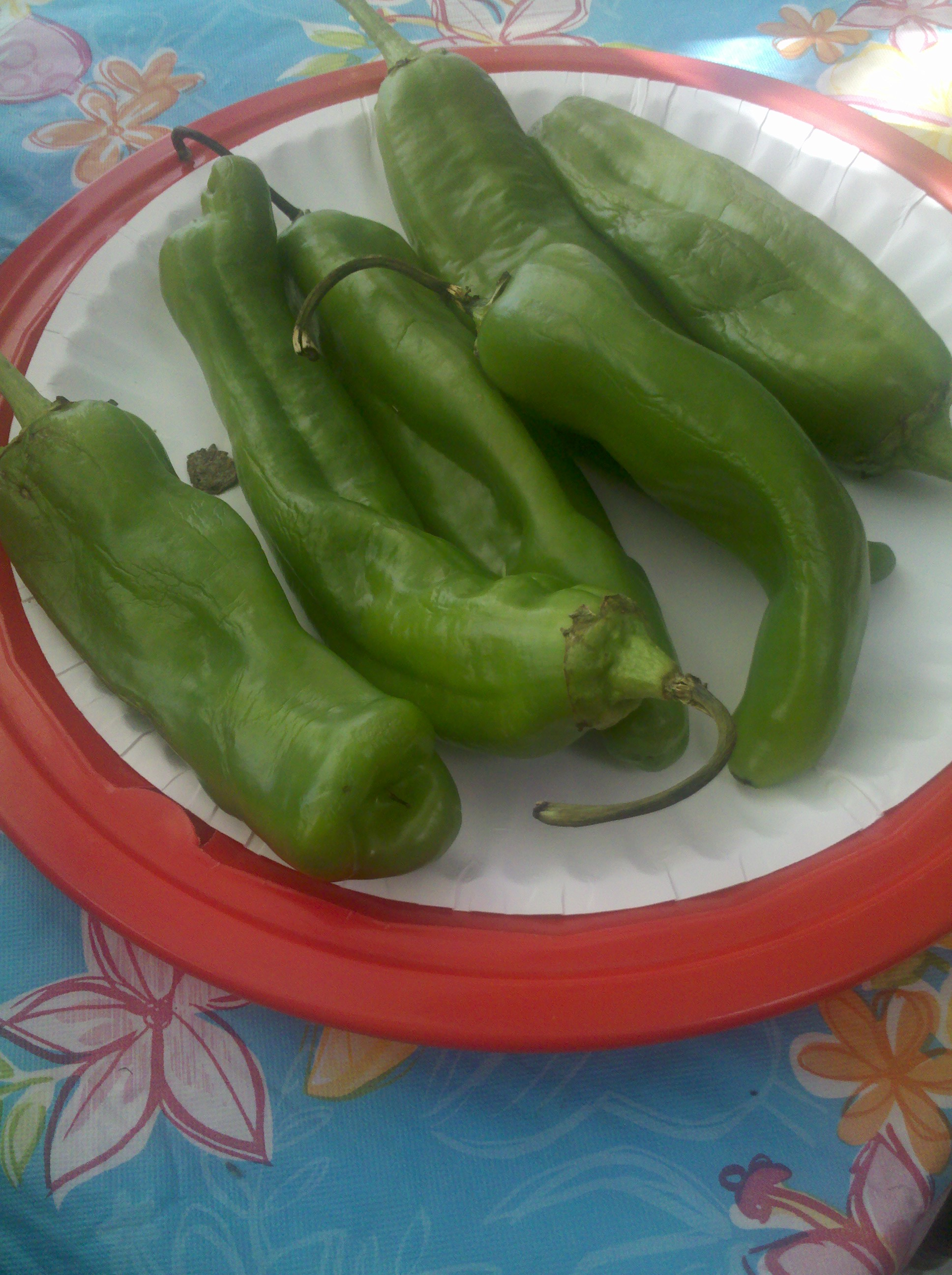
New Mexico green chile is a staple of New Mexican cuisine.

Cuisine in this region tends to have certain key ingredients: tomatoes, onions, black beans, pinto beans, rice, bell peppers, chile peppers, and cheese, in particular Monterey Jack, invented to the north in the Central Coast area of California in the 19th century and itself often further altered into pepper Jack where spicy jalapeño peppers are incorporated into the cheese to create a smoky taste.

Chili peppers play an important role in the cuisine, with a few native to the region. This is especially true with the region's distinct New Mexico chile pepper, still grown by Hispanos of New Mexico and Puebloans the most sought after of which come from the Hatch valley, Albuquerque's Central Rio Grande, Chimayo, and Pueblos.

In New Mexico, chile is eaten on a variety of foods, such as the green chile cheeseburger, made popular by fast-food chains like Blake's Lotaburger. Indeed, even national fast food chains operating in the state, such as McDonald's, offer locally grown chile on many of their menu items.

In the 20th century a few more recent additions have arrived like the poblano pepper, rocoto pepper, ghost pepper, thai chili pepper, and Korean pepper, the last three especially when discussing Southern California and its large population from East and South Asia.

Cornbread is consumed; the recipe differs from Eastern ones in that the batter is cooked in a cast-iron skillet.

Outdoor cooking is popular and still uses an old method settlers brought from the East, in which a cast-iron Dutch oven is covered with the coals of the fire and stacked or hung from a tripod; this is different from the earthenware pots of Mexico.

Tortillas are still made the traditional way here and form an important component of the spicy breakfast burrito, which contains ham, eggs, and salsa or pico de gallo. They are also used for regular burritos, which contains any combination of marinated meats, vegetables, and piquant chilis; smothered burritos, often both containing and topped with New Mexico chile sauces; quesadillas, a much loved grilled dish where cheese and other ingredients are stuffed between two tortillas and served by the slice; and steak fajitas, where sliced skirt steak sizzles in a skillet with caramelized onions.

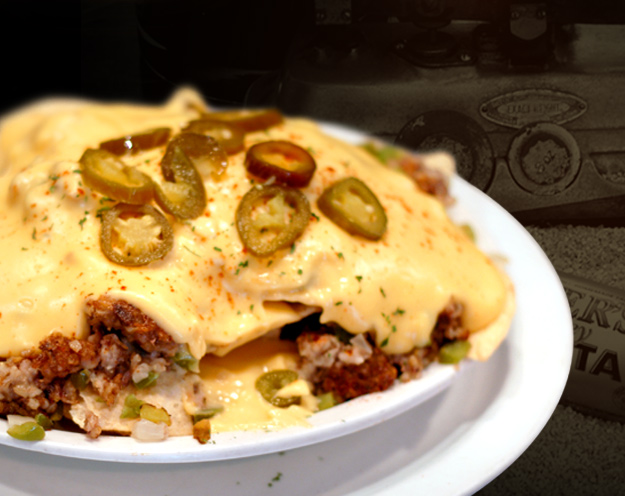
Nachos with cheese

Unlike in Mexico, tortillas in this region may also incorporate vegetables like spinach into the flatbread dough to make wraps, which were invented in Southern California. Food here tends to use pungent spices and condiments, typically chili verde sauce, various kinds of hot sauce, sriracha sauce, chili powder, cayenne pepper, white pepper, cumin, paprika, onion powder, thyme and black pepper. Nowhere is this fiery mix of spice more evident than in the dishes chili con carne, a meaty stew, and cowboy beans, both of which are a feature of regional cookoffs.

Southern California has several additions like five spice powder, rosemary, curry powder, kimchi, and lemongrass, with many of these brought by recent immigration to the region and often a feature of Southern California's fusion cuisine, popular in fine dining.

In Texas, the local barbecue is often entirely made up of beef brisket or large rib racks, where the meat is seasoned with a spice rub and cooked over coals of mesquite. In other parts of the state, they smoke the meat and peppery sausages over high heat using pecan, apple, and oak wood, and serve them with a side of pickled vegetables, a legacy of German and Czech settlers of the late 1800s.

California is home to Santa Maria–style barbecue, where the spices involved generally are black pepper, paprika, and garlic salt, and grill over the coals of coast live oak.

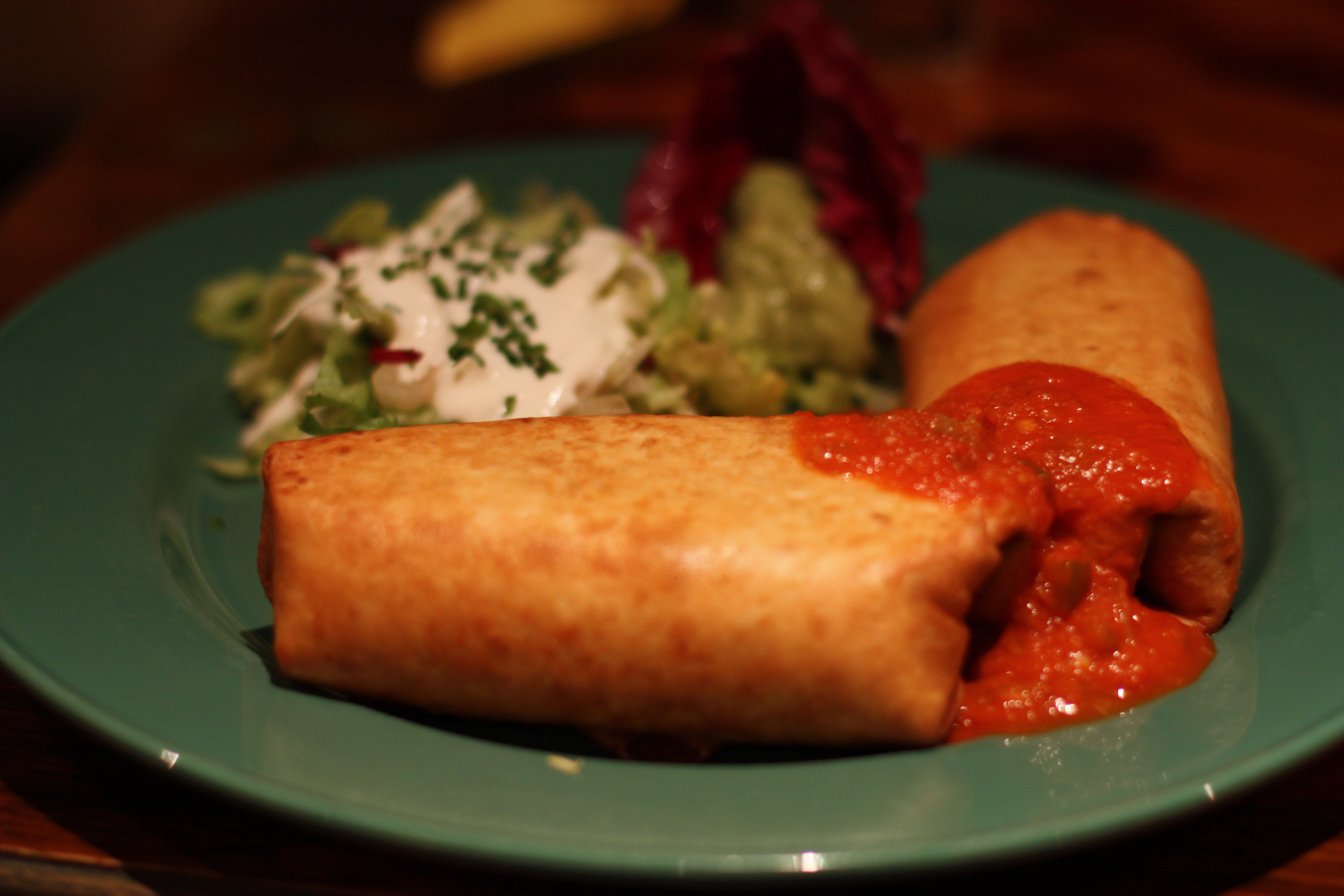
A chimichanga

Native American additions may include Navajo frybread and corn on the cob, often roasted on the grill while still in the husk. A typical accompaniment or appetizer of all these states is the tortilla chip, which sometimes includes cornmeal from cultivars of corn that are blue or red in addition to the standard yellow of sweetcorn, and is served with salsa of varying hotness.

Tortilla chips also are an ingredient in the Tex Mex dish nachos, where these chips are loaded with any combination of ground beef, melted Monterey Jack, cheddar, or Colby cheese, guacamole, sour cream, and salsa, and Texas usually prefers a version of potato salad as a side dish.

For alcohol, a key ingredient is tequila: this spirit has been made on both sides of the US-Mexican border for generations, and in modern cuisine it is a must-have in a bartender's arsenal as well as an addition to dishes for sauteeing.

Southern California is more focused on the coast. It has had greater contact with immigration from the West Pacific and Baja California, and has the international city of Los Angeles as its capital. Here, the prime mode of transportation is by car.

Drive-through fast food was invented in this area, but so was the concept of the gourmet burger movement, giving birth to chains like In-N-Out Burger, with many variations of burgers including chili, multiple patties, avocado, special sauces, and Angus or wagyu beef. Common accompaniments include thick milkshakes in flavors such as mint, chocolate, peanut butter, vanilla, strawberry, and mango.

Smoothies are a common breakfast item made with fresh fruit juice, yogurt, and crushed ice. Agua fresca, a drink originating with Mexican immigrants, is a common hot-weather beverage sold in many supermarkets and at mom-and-pop stands, available in citrus, watermelon, and strawberry flavors; the California version is usually served chilled without grain.

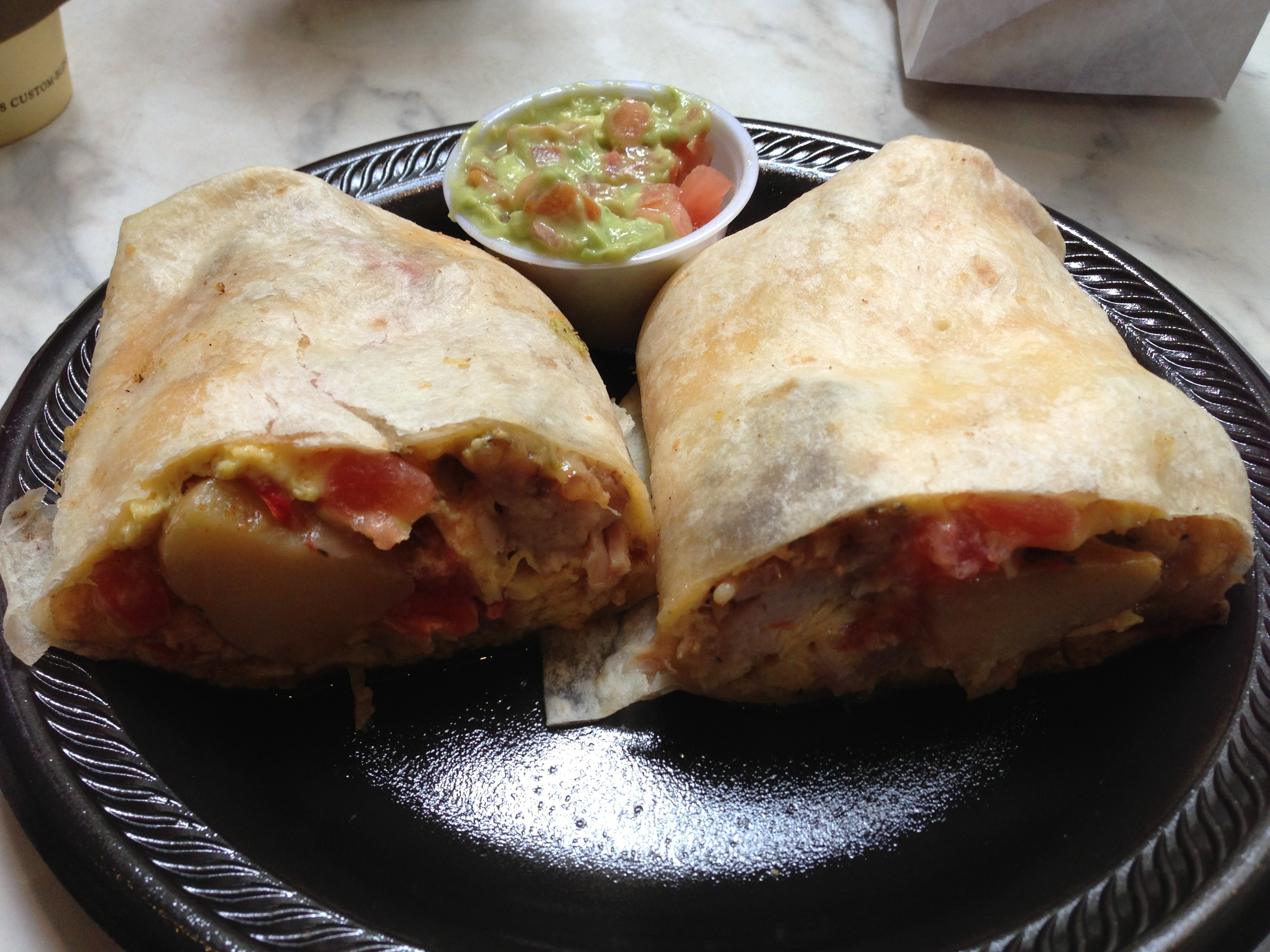
Machaca with pork, eggs, and potatoes wrapped in a tortilla, served with salsa

The weather in Southern California is such that the temperature rarely drops below 54 °F (12 °C) in winter, thus, sun-loving crops like pistachios, kiwifruit, avocadoes, strawberries, and tomatoes are staple crops of the region, the last often dried in the sun and a feature of salads and sandwiches.

Olive oil is a staple cooking oil of the region and has been since the days of Junípero Serra; today, the mission olive is a common tree growing in a Southern Californian's back garden. As a crop, olives are increasingly a signature of the region along with Valencia oranges and Meyer lemons.

Soybeans, bok choy, Japanese persimmon, thai basil, Napa cabbage, nori, mandarin oranges, water chestnuts, and mung beans are other crops brought to the region from East Asia. They are common additions to salads as the emphasis on fresh produce in both Southern and Northern California is strong.

Other vegetables and herbs have a distinct Mediterranean flavor, which would include oregano, basil, summer squash, eggplant, and broccoli, with all of the above extensively available at farmers' markets all around Southern California.

Naturally, salads native to Southern California tend to be hearty affairs, like Cobb salad and Chinese chicken salad, and dressings like green goddess and ranch are a staple.

California-style pizza tends to feature a variety of ingredients, emphasizing vegetables, along with any combination of chili oil, prawns, eggs, chicken, shiitake mushrooms, olives, bell pepper, goat cheese, and feta cheese. Peanut noodles often include a sweet dressing, chopped peanuts, and lo mein noodles.

Fresh fish and shellfish in Southern California tend to be expensive in restaurants. Still, every year since the end of WWII, the Pismo clam festival has taken place, where the local population takes a large species of clam and bakes, stuffs, and roasts it, as it is a regional delicacy.

Fishing for Pacific species of octopus and the Humboldt squid are common, and both are a feature of East Asian and other L.A. fish markets. Lingcod is a coveted regional fish that is often caught in the autumn off the coast of San Diego and in the Channel Islands and often served baked. California sheephead are often grilled and are much sought after by spear fishermen and the immigrant Chinese population, in which case they are basket-steamed.

In recent years, California spiny lobster, which can grow to 44 lb, has become more popular. It now rivals the fishery for Dungeness crab in its importance.

=== Pacific and Hawaiian cuisine ===
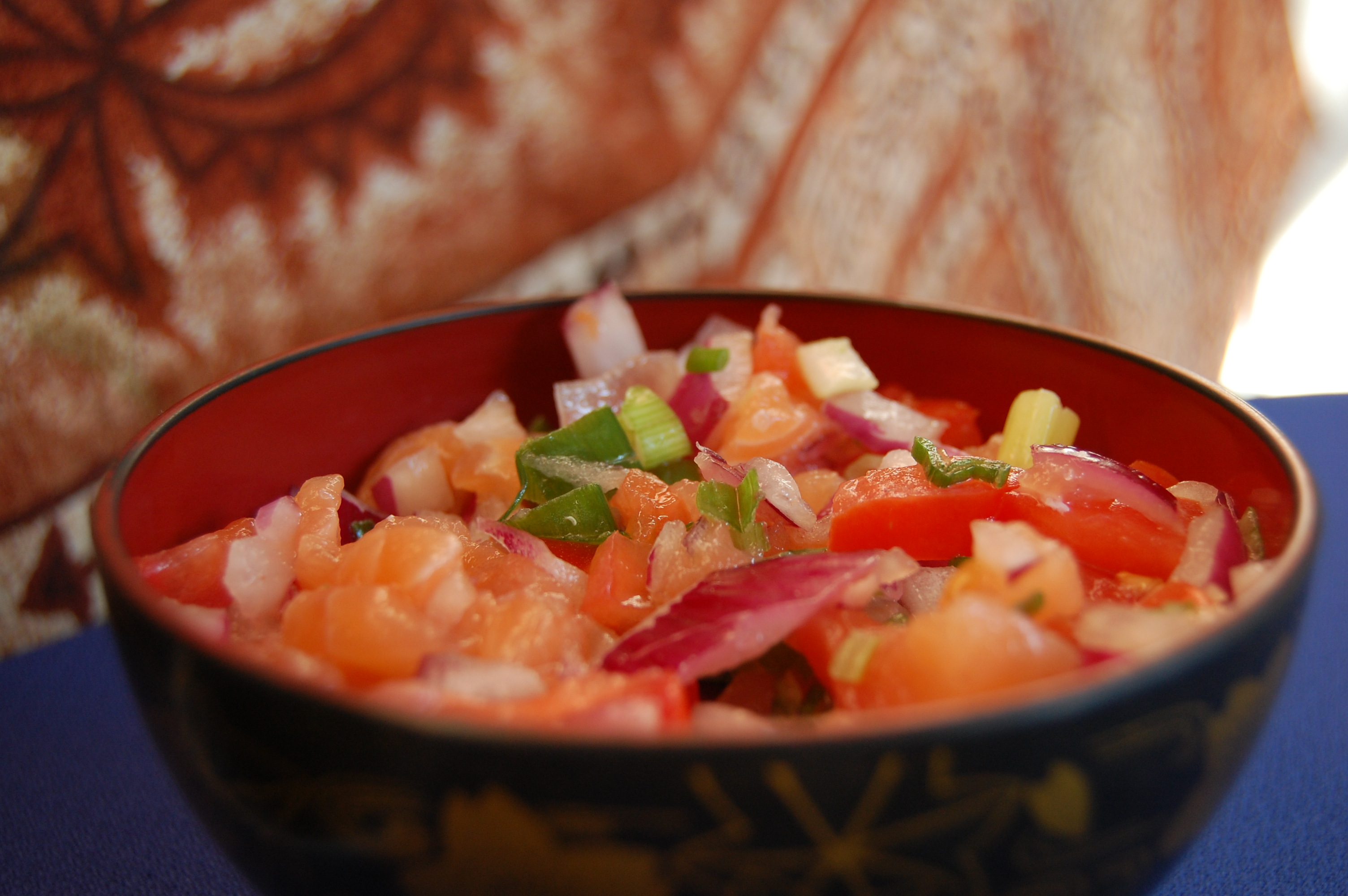
Lomi-lomi salmon

Hawaii is often considered one of the most culturally diverse U.S. states, the only state with an Asian-majority population, and one of the few places where United States territory extends into the tropics. As a result, Hawaiian cuisine borrows elements of a variety of cuisines, particularly those of Asian and Pacific-rim cultures, as well as traditional native Hawaiian and a few additions from the American mainland.

American influence over the last 150 years has brought cattle, goats, and sheep to the islands, introducing cheese, butter, and yogurt, as well as crops like red cabbage.

Major Asian and Polynesian influences on modern Hawaiian cuisine come from Japan, Korea, Vietnam, China (especially the Pearl River Delta), Samoa, and the Philippines. From Japan, the concept of serving raw fish as a meal with rice was introduced, as was soft tofu, setting the stage for the popular dish called poke.

Immigrants from Korea to Hawaii brought a love of spicy, garlic-marinated meat and kimchi. From China, their version of char siu baau evolved into modern manapua, a steamed pork bun with a spicy filling.

Filipinos brought vinegar, bagoong, and lumpia, and during the 20th century immigrants from American Samoa brought the open pit fire umu and the Vietnamese introduced lemongrass and fish sauce.

Each East Asian culture brought several different kinds of noodles, including udon, ramen, mei fun, and pho, and today these are common lunchtime meals.

Much of this cuisine mixes and melts into traditions like the lu'au, whose traditional elaborate fare was once the prerogative of kings and queens but is today the subject of parties for both tourists and private parties for the ‘ohana (meaning family and close friends).

Traditionally, women and men ate separately under the Hawaiian kapu system, a system of religious beliefs that honored the Hawaiian gods similar to the Maori tapu system, though in this case had some specific prohibitions towards females eating things like coconut, pork, turtle meat, and bananas as these were considered parts of the male gods. Punishment for violation could be severe, as a woman might endanger a man's mana, or soul, by eating with him or otherwise by eating the forbidden food because doing so dishonored the male gods.

As the system broke down after 1810, introductions of foods from laborers on plantations began to be included at feasts and much cross-pollination occurred, where Asian foodstuffs mixed with Polynesian foodstuffs like breadfruit, kukui nuts, and purple sweet potatoes.

Some notable Hawaiian fare includes seared ahi tuna, opakapaka (snapper) with passionfruit, Hawaiian island-raised lamb, beef and meat products, Hawaiian plate lunch, and Molokai shrimp. Seafood traditionally is caught fresh in Hawaiian waters; particular delicacies are ula poni, papaikualoa, ‘opihi, and ‘opihi malihini, better known as Hawaiian spiny lobster, Kona crab, Hawaiian limpet, and abalone, the last brought over with Japanese immigrants.

Some cuisine also incorporates a wide variety of produce and locally grown agricultural products, including tomatoes, sweet Maui onions, taro, and macadamia nuts. Tropical fruits also play an important role in the cuisine as a flavoring in cocktails and in desserts, including local cultivars of bananas, sweetsop, mangoes, lychee, coconuts, papayas, and lilikoi (passionfruit). Pineapples have been an island staple since the 19th century and figure into many marinades and drinks.

=== Common dishes found on a regional level ===
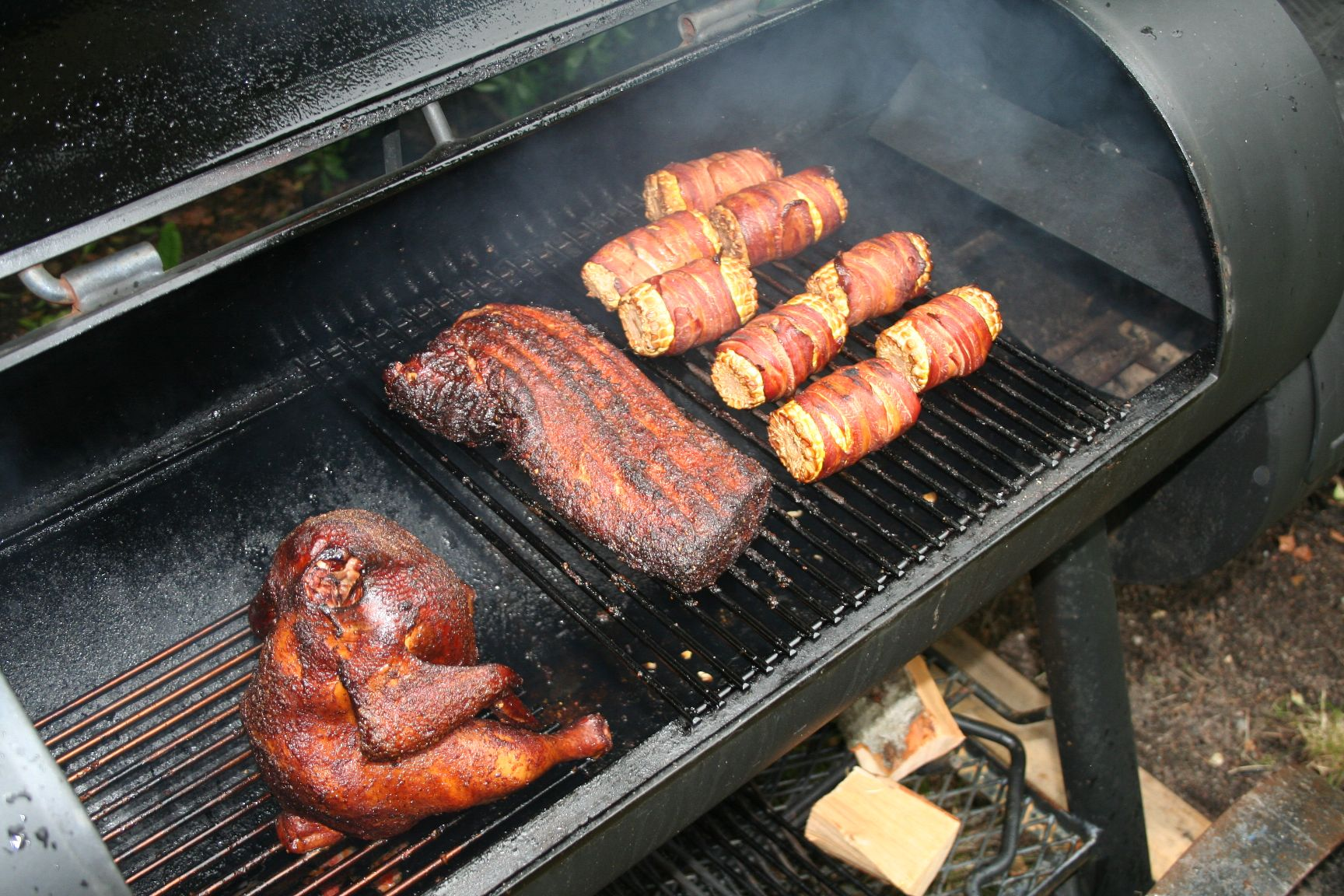
Chicken, pork and corn cooking in a barbecue smoker

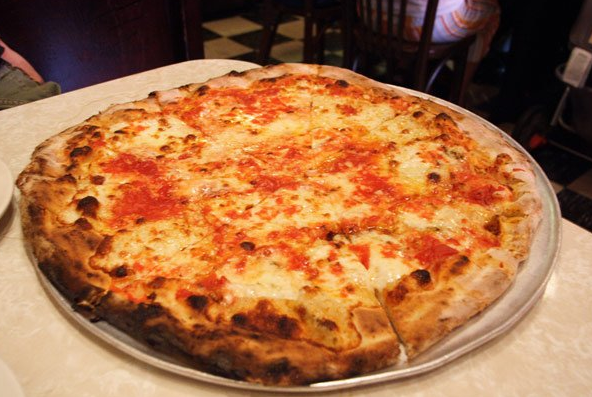
New York–style pizza served at a pizzeria in New York

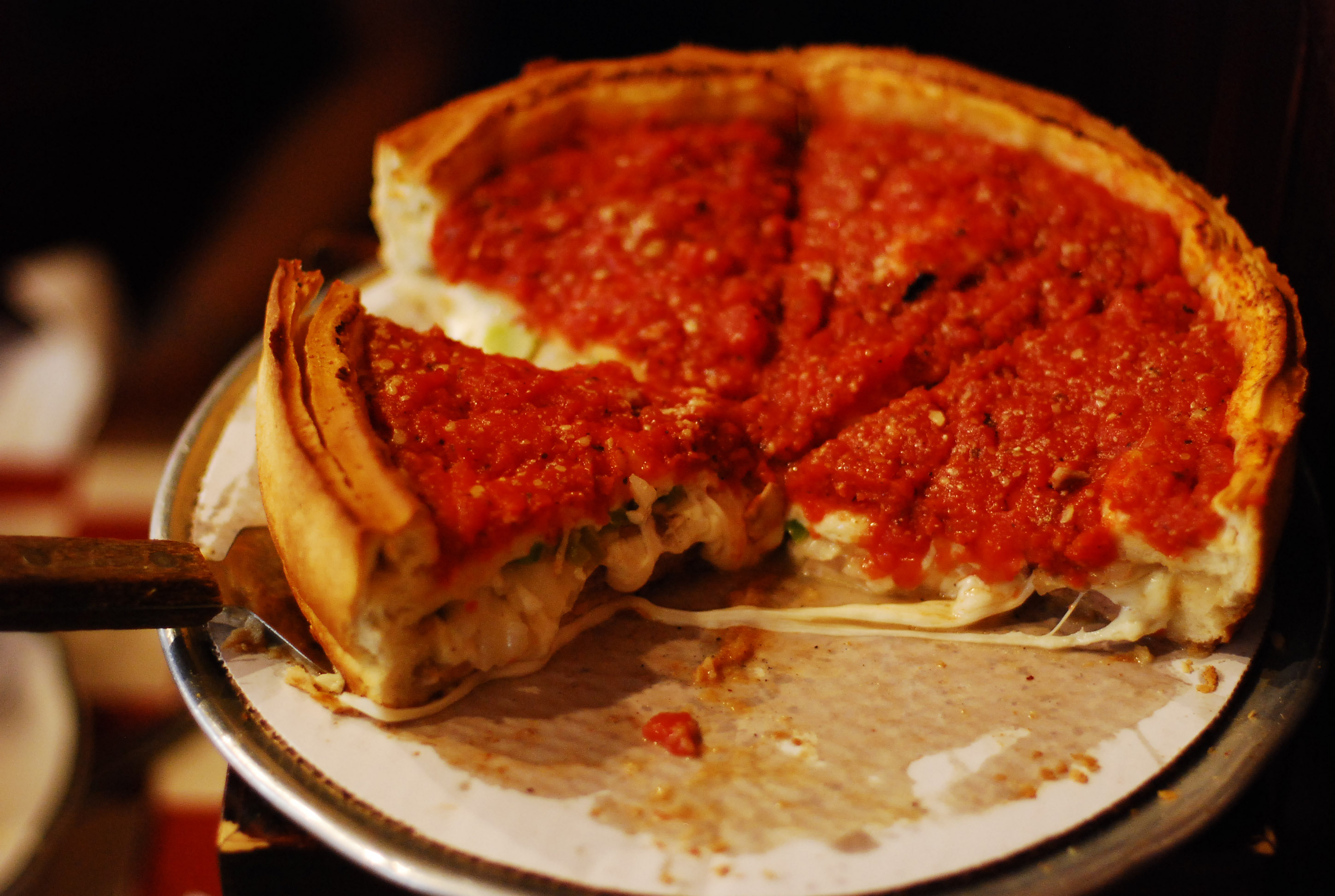
Chicago-style deep-dish pizza from the original Giordano's location

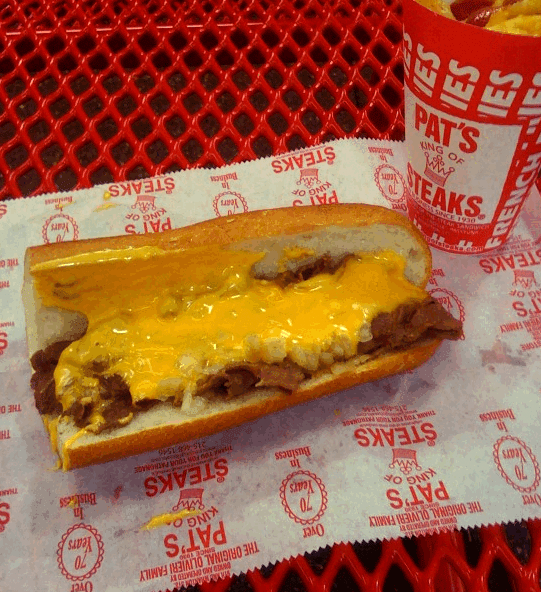
A Philly cheesesteak from Pat's King of Steaks in Philadelphia

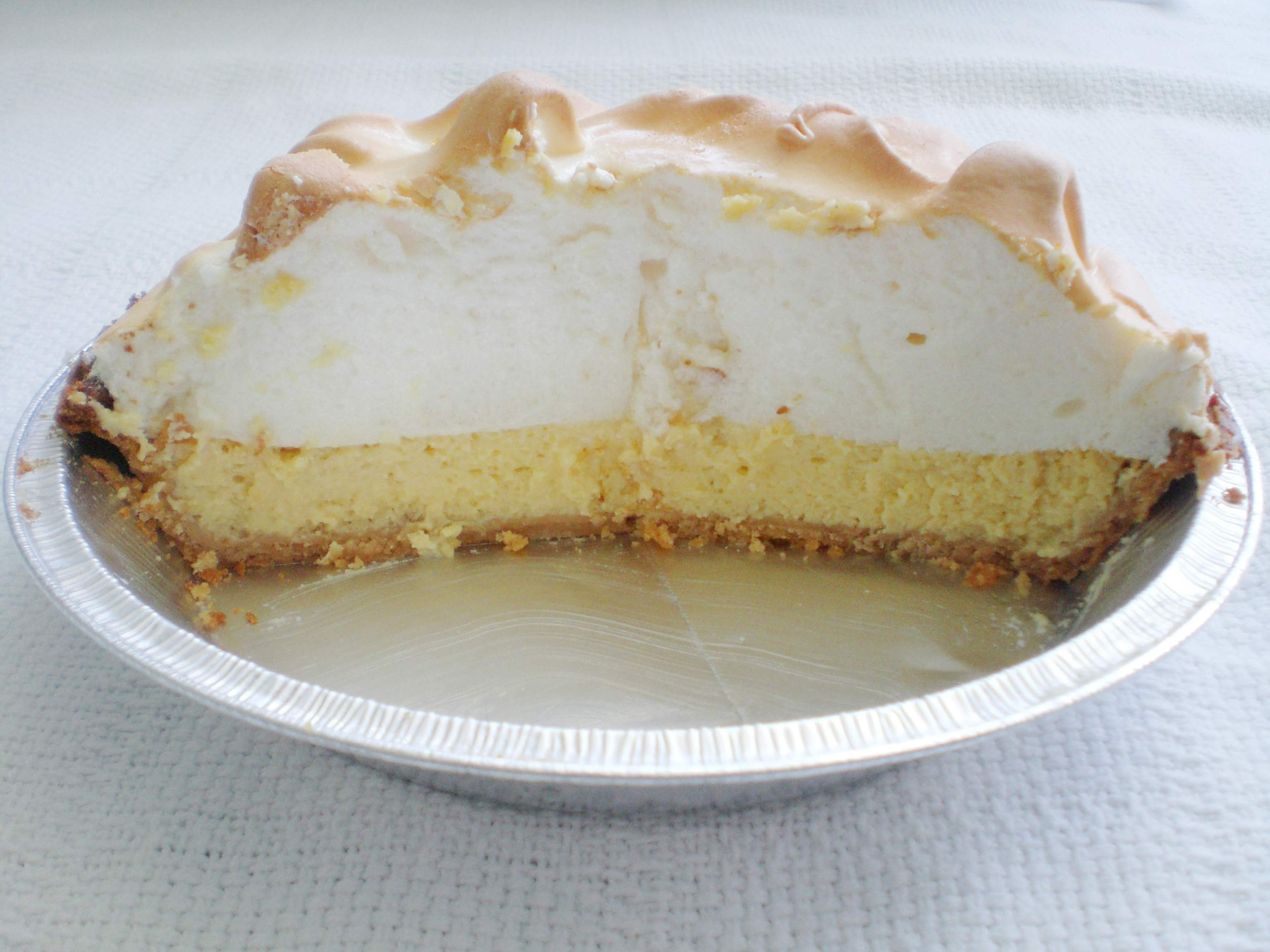
Key lime pie is from Key West, Florida.

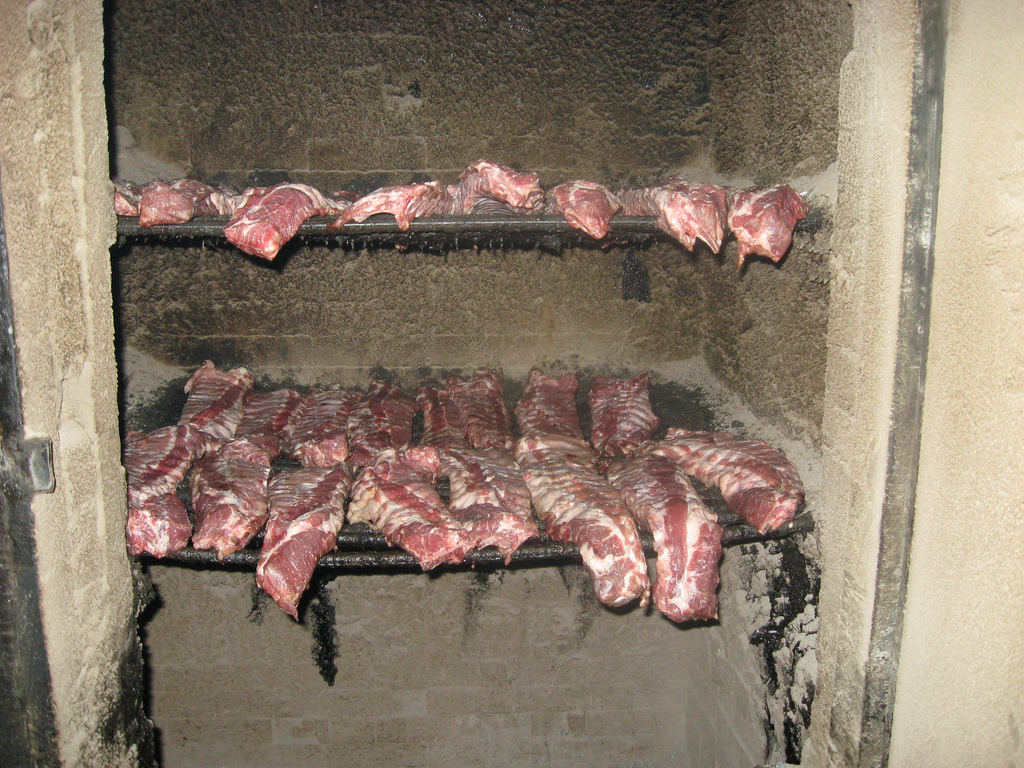
Memphis-style barbecue

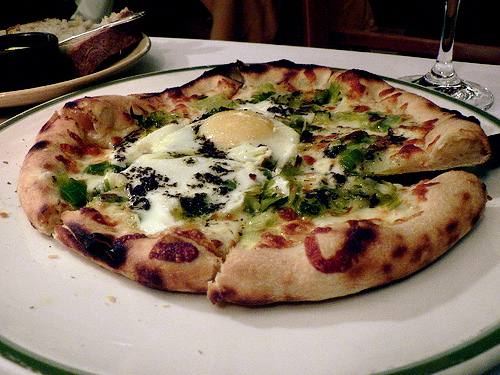
California-style pizza

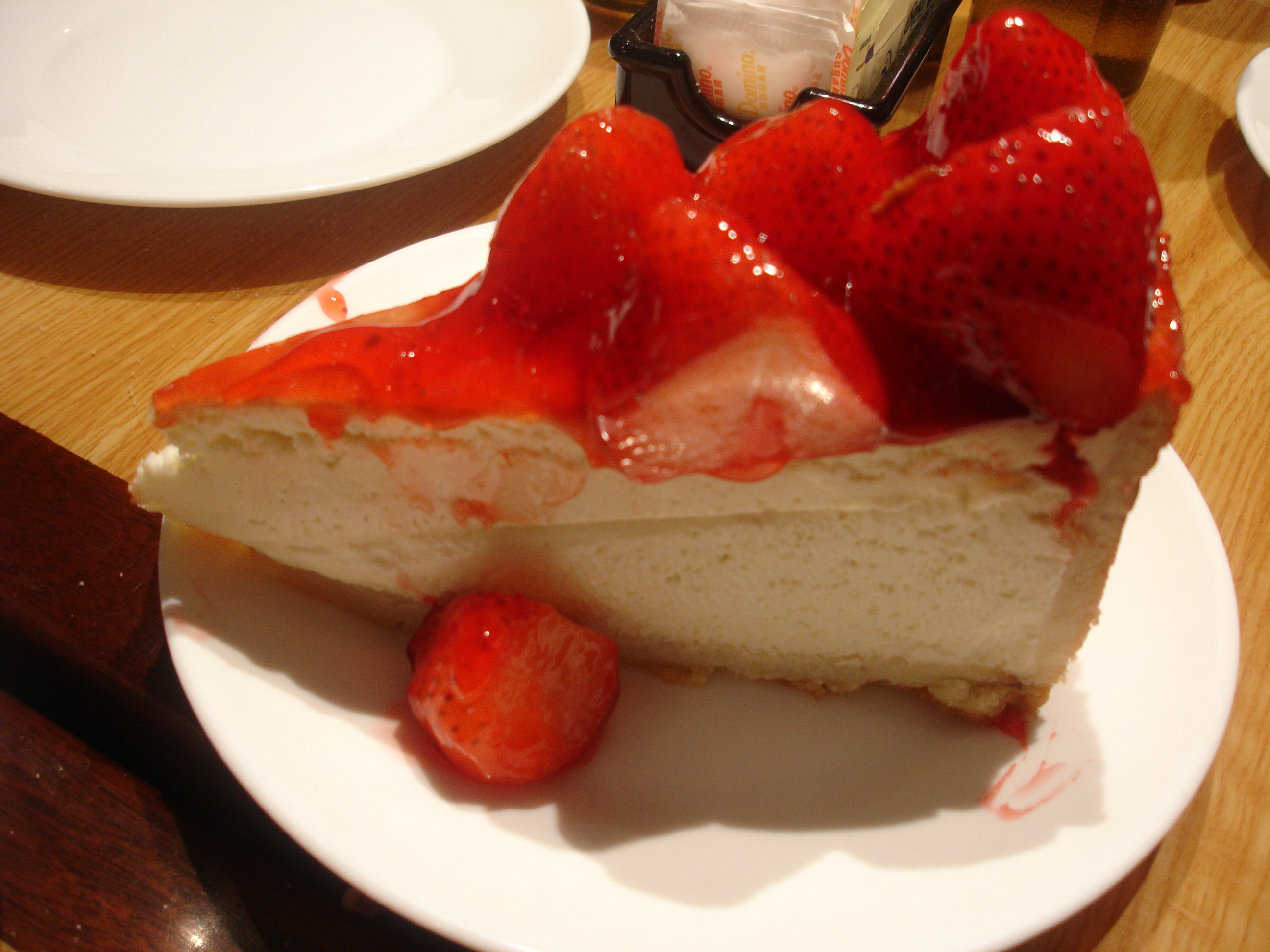
New York–style cheesecake

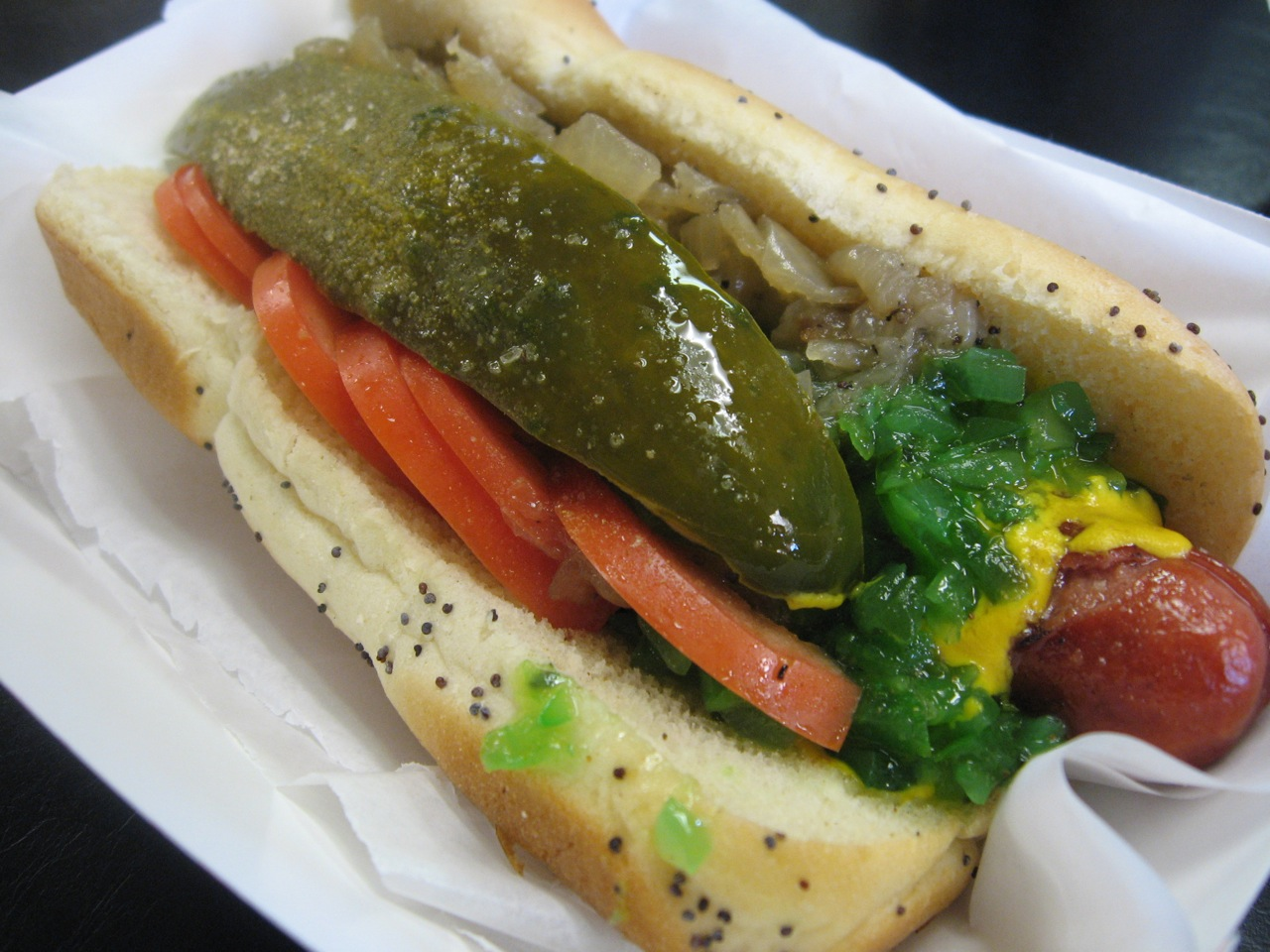
Chicago-style hot dog

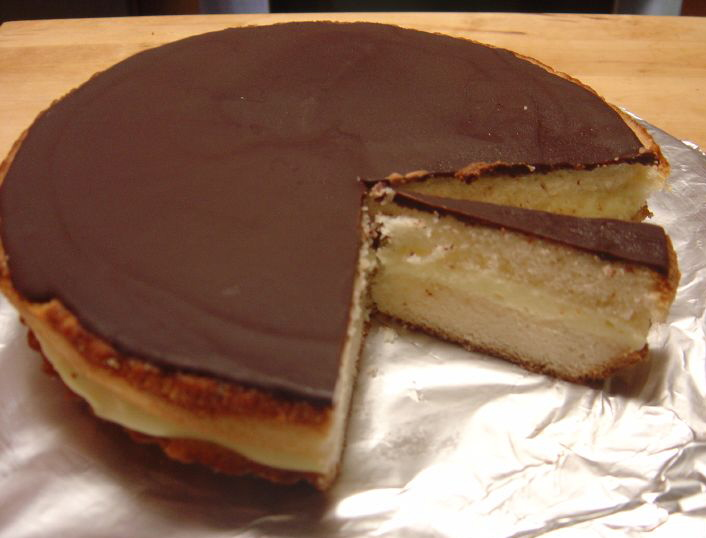
Boston cream pie

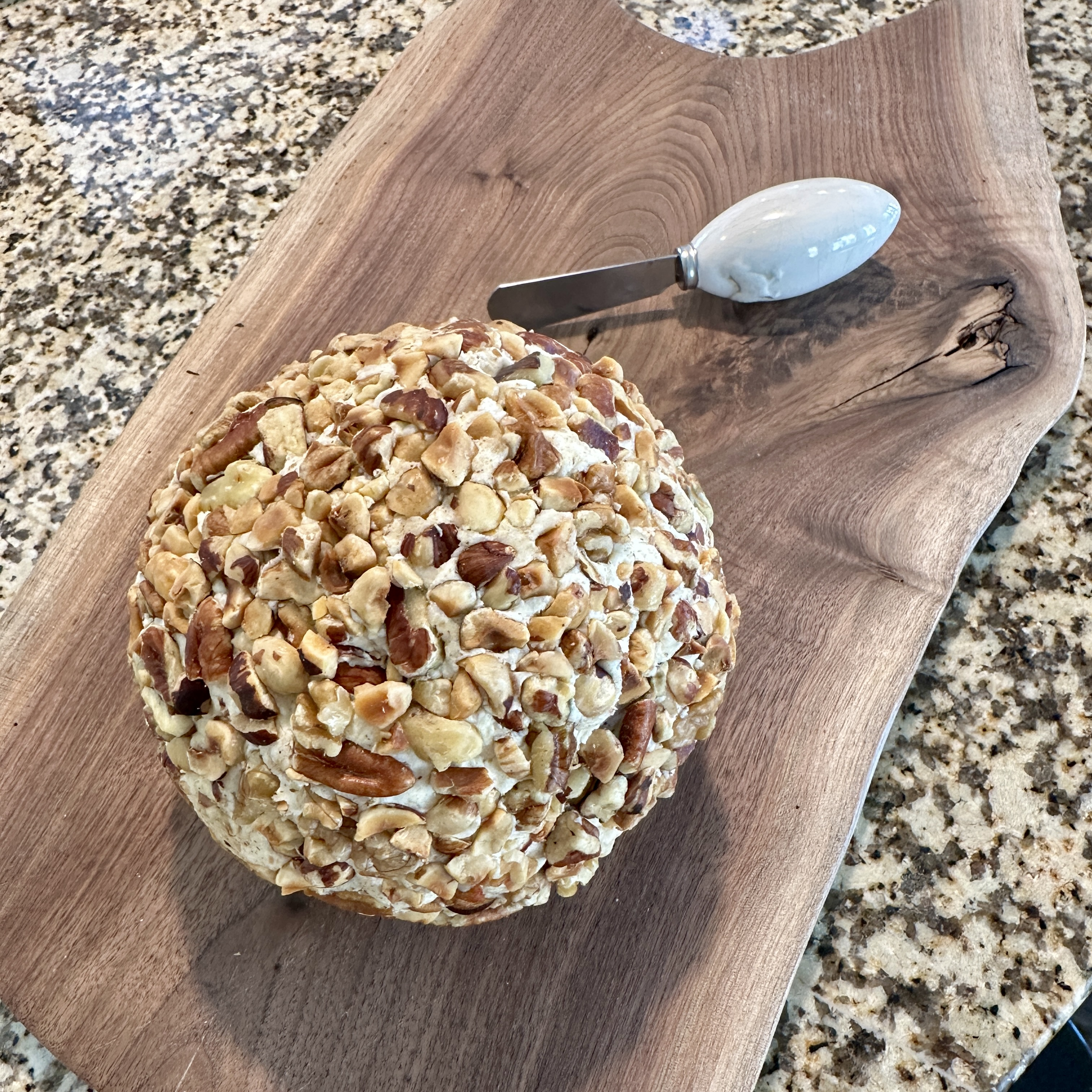
Cheese ball

== Ethnicity-specific and immigrant influence ==
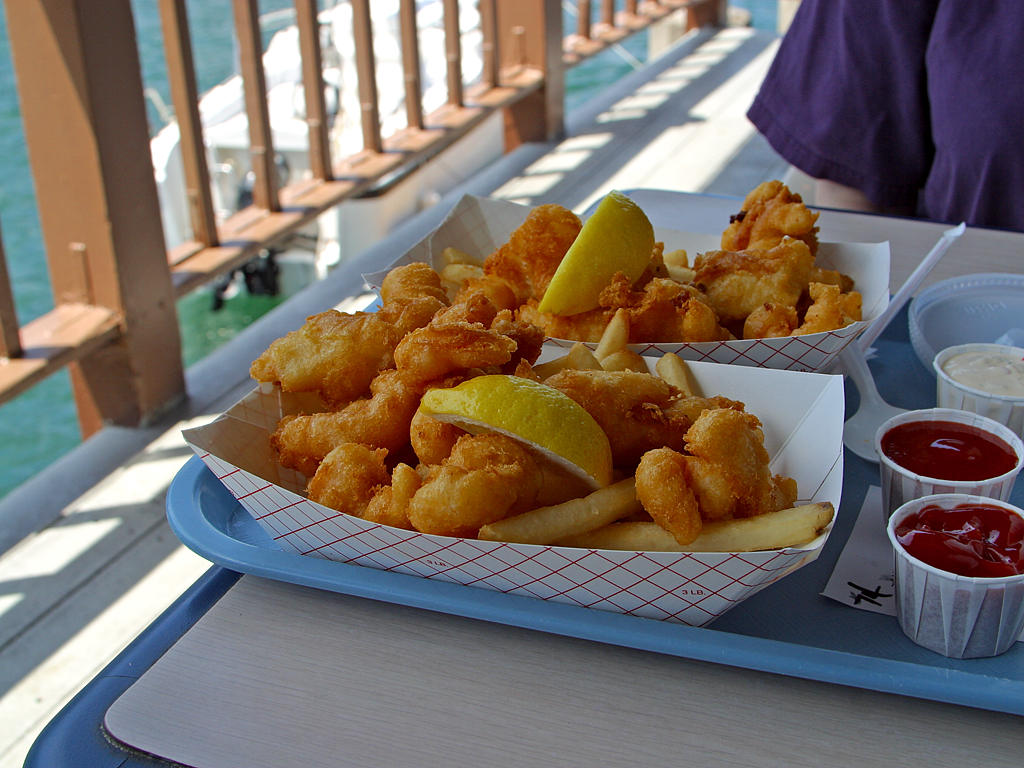
Fried fish and french fries in San Diego, California

The influence of ethnicity-specific cuisines such as Italian cuisine and Mexican cuisine was evident in the United States by World War I. There are recipes for Chilean meat pies, chicken chop suey, chow mein, Mexican pork pastries and Italian meatballs going back to at least the 1930s, but many of the recipes were Anglicized and they appeared relatively infrequently compared to Northern European recipes.

Nineteenth-century cookbooks bear evidence of diverse influences, with some including recipes like Indian pickle, Italian pork, and various curries. Nineteenth-century literature shows knowledge of Jewish, Russian, Italian, Chinese and Greek-American cuisines, and foreign cookbooks continued to grow more detailed through World War I including recipes like Peruvian chicken, Mexican enchiladas, Chilean corn pudding and Hindustan chicken curry.

Louise Rice, author of Dainty Dishes from Foreign Lands, describes the recipes in her book as "not wholly vegetarian", though, at the time of publication in 1911, notes that most of the recipes would likely be new to average American cooks and would likely contain higher proportions of vegetables to meat. She includes Italian pasta recipes like macaroni in milk, soups, and polentas and German recipes like liver dumplings called Leberknödel and a variation of Sauerbraten.

The demand for ethnic foods in the United States reflects the nation's evolving diversity and development. According to the National Restaurant Association,

Restaurant industry sales are expected to reach a record high of $476 billion in 2005, an increase of 4.9 percent over 2004... Driven by consumer demand, the ethnic food market reached record sales in 2002, and has emerged as the fastest growing category in the food and beverage product sector, according to USBX Advisory Services. Minorities in the U.S. spend a combined $142 billion on food and by 2010, America's ethnic population is expected to grow by 40 percent.

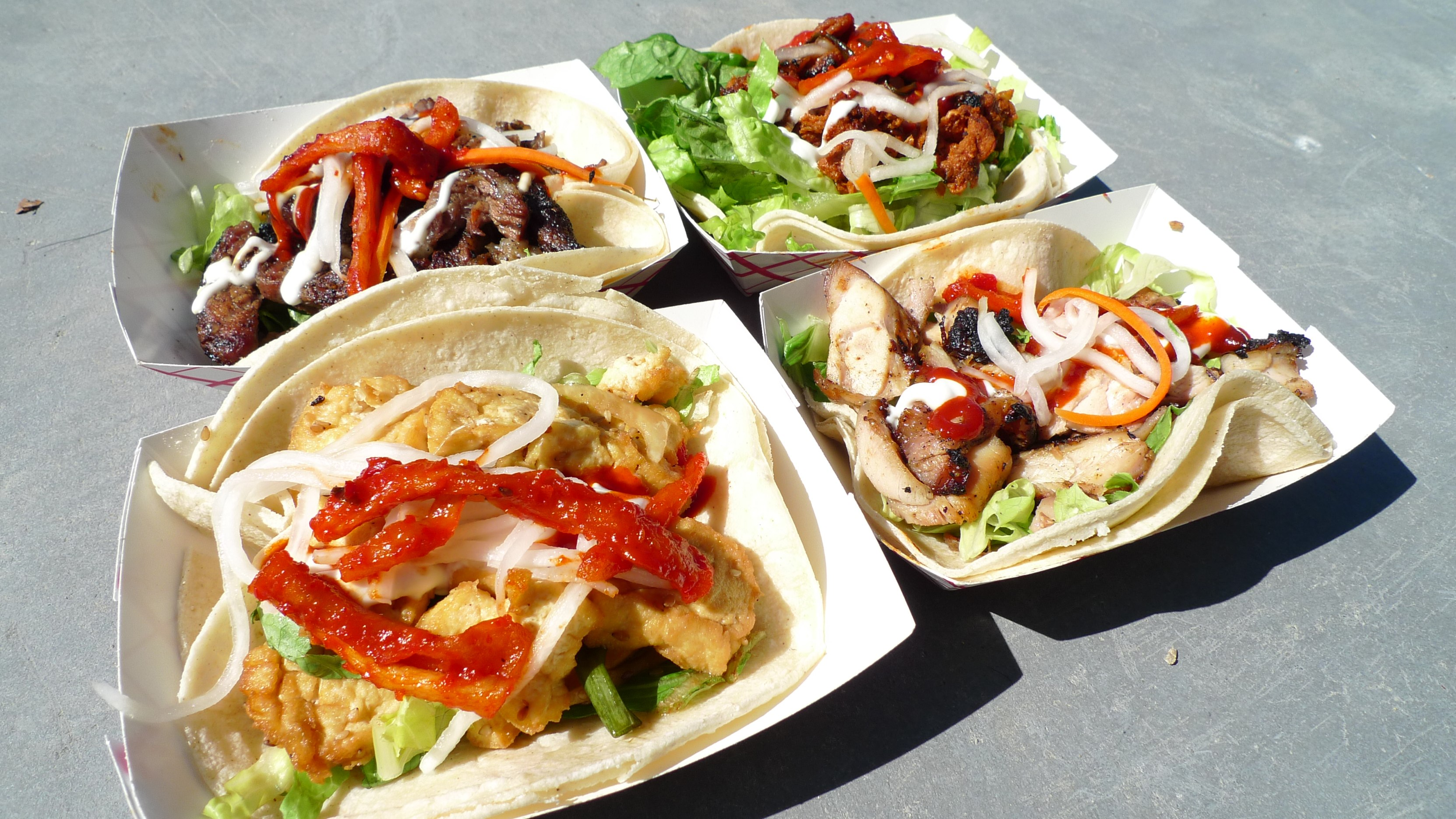
Korean tacos from the "Seoul on Wheels" truck in San Francisco

A movement began in the 1980s among prominent chefs to reclaim America's ethnic foods within their regional traditions, where these trends originated. One of the earliest was Paul Prudhomme, who in 1984 began the introduction of his influential cookbook, Paul Prudhomme's Louisiana Kitchen, by describing the over 200-year history of Creole and Cajun cooking; he aims to "preserve and expand the Louisiana tradition." Prodhomme's success quickly inspired other chefs. Norman Van Aken embraced a Floridian-style cuisine fused with many ethnic and global elements in his 1988 cookbook, Feast of Sunlight. California became swept up in the movement, then seemingly started to lead the trend itself, in, for example, the popular restaurant Chez Panisse in Berkeley.

Examples of the Chez Panisse phenomenon, chefs who embraced a new globalized cuisine, were celebrity chefs like Jeremiah Tower and Wolfgang Puck, both former colleagues at the restaurant. Puck went on to describe his belief in contemporary, new-style American cuisine in the introduction to The Wolfgang Puck Cookbook:

Another major breakthrough, whose originators were once thought to be crazy, is the mixing of ethnic cuisines. It is not at all uncommon to find raw fish listed next to tortillas on the same menu. Ethnic crossovers also occur when distinct elements meet in a single recipe. This country is, after all, a huge melting pot. Why should its cooking not illustrate the American transformation of diversity into unity?

Puck's former colleague, Jeremiah Tower, became synonymous with California Cuisine and the overall American culinary revolution. Meanwhile, the restaurant that inspired both Puck and Tower became a distinguished establishment, popularizing its so-called "mantra" in its 1988 book, Chez Panisse Cooking, by Paul Bertolli and owner Alice Waters. Published well after the restaurant's founding in 1971, this new cookbook seemed to perfect the idea and philosophy that had developed over the years. The book embraced America's natural bounty, specifically California's, while including recipes that reflected Bertoli and Waters's appreciation for both northern Italian and French-style foods.

=== Early ethnic influences ===
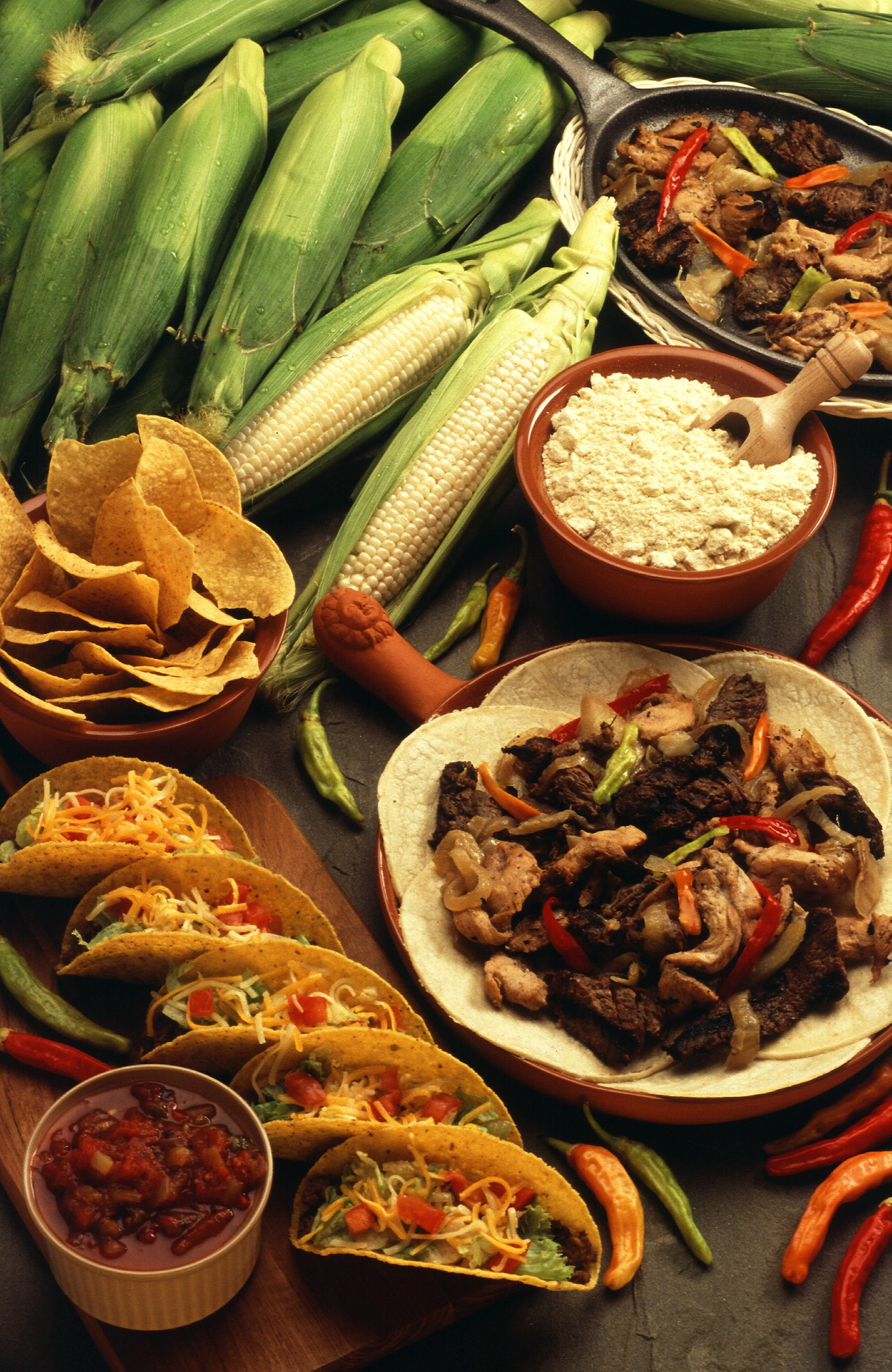
Adaptation of Mexican food tailored for the mainstream American market usually is different from Mexican food typically served in Mexico.

While the earliest cuisine of the United States was influenced by Native Americans, the thirteen colonies, or the antebellum South, the overall culture of the nation, its gastronomy and the growing culinary arts became ever more influenced by its changing ethnic mix and immigrant patterns from the 18th and 19th centuries unto the present. Some of the ethnic groups that continued to influence the cuisine had been here in prior years; others arrived in greater numbers during "The Great Transatlantic Migration" (of 1870–1914) or other mass migrations.

Some of the ethnic influences could be found across the nation after the American Civil War and into the continental expansion for most of the 19th century. Ethnic influences already in the nation at that time would include the following groups and their respective cuisines:

- Select nationalities of Europe and the respective developments from early modern European cuisine of the colonial age:
  - British-Americans and on-going developments in New England cuisine, the national traditions founded in the cuisine of the original thirteen colonies, The Cuisine of the Southern United States, and many aspects of other regional cuisine.
  - Spanish Americans and early modern Spanish cuisine, as well as Basque-Americans and Basque cuisine.
  - Early German-American or Pennsylvania Dutch and Pennsylvania Dutch cuisine
  - French Americans and their New World regional identities such as:
    - Acadian
    - Cajun and Cajun cuisine
  - Louisiana Creole and Louisiana Creole cuisine. Louisiana Creole (also called French Créole) refers to native-born people of the New Orleans area who are descended from the French and Spanish settlers of Colonial Louisiana before it became part of the United States in 1803 with the Louisiana Purchase.
- The various ethnicities originating from the early gastronomy and cuisines of the New World, Latin American cuisine, and North American cuisine:
  - Native Americans in the United States and Native American cuisine
  - African Americans and Soul food.
  - Puerto Rican cuisine
  - Mexican Americans and Mexican-American cuisine; as well as related regional cuisines:
    - Tex-Mex (regional Texas and Mexican fusion)
    - Some aspects of "Southwestern cuisine".
  - New Mexican cuisine from New Mexico and the historical region of Santa Fe de Nuevo México, and now ethnically tied to the Pueblos and Hispanos of New Mexico.

=== Later ethnic and immigrant influence ===
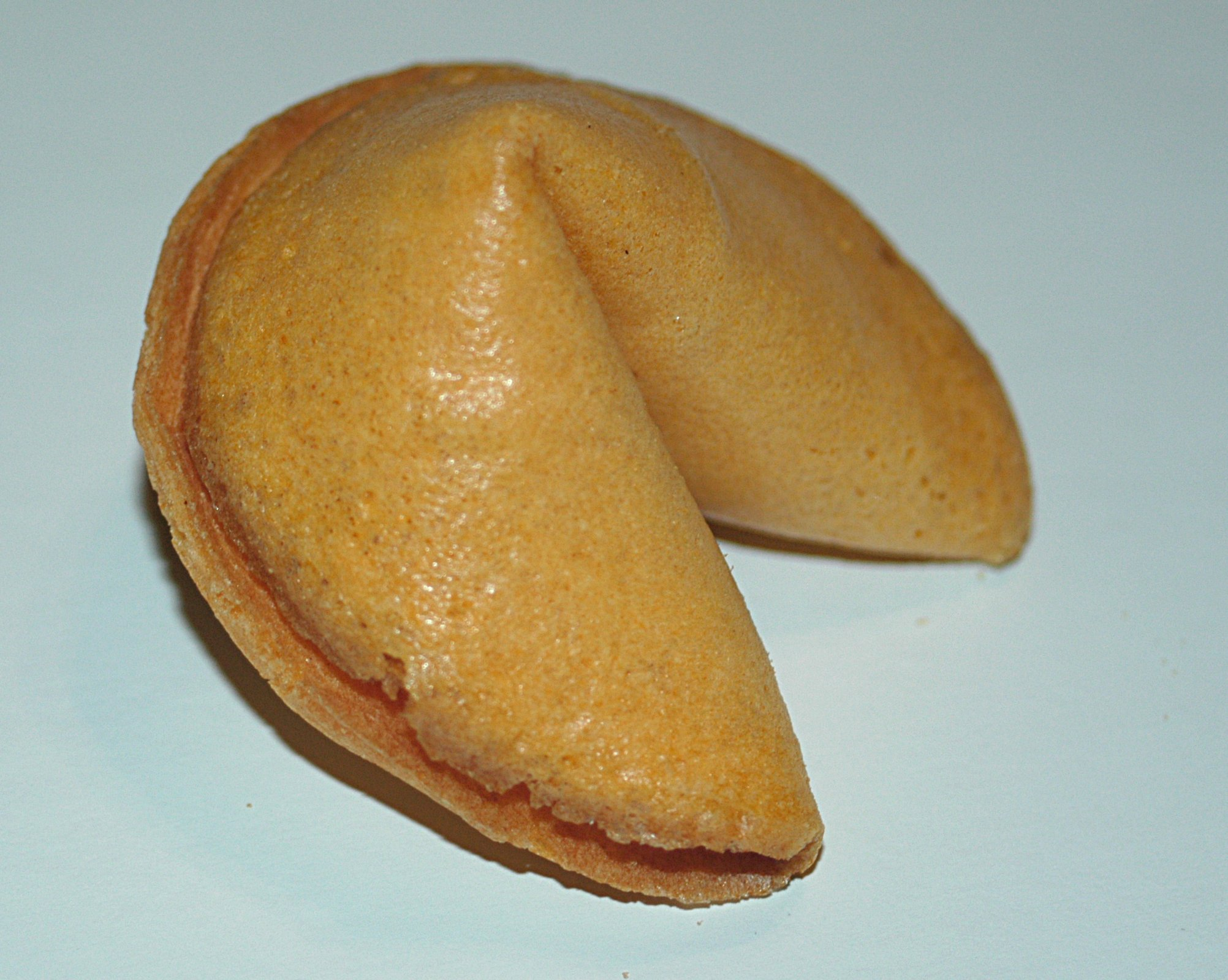
Fortune cookies were invented in the United States and are of Japanese origin but are popular in American Chinese cuisine.

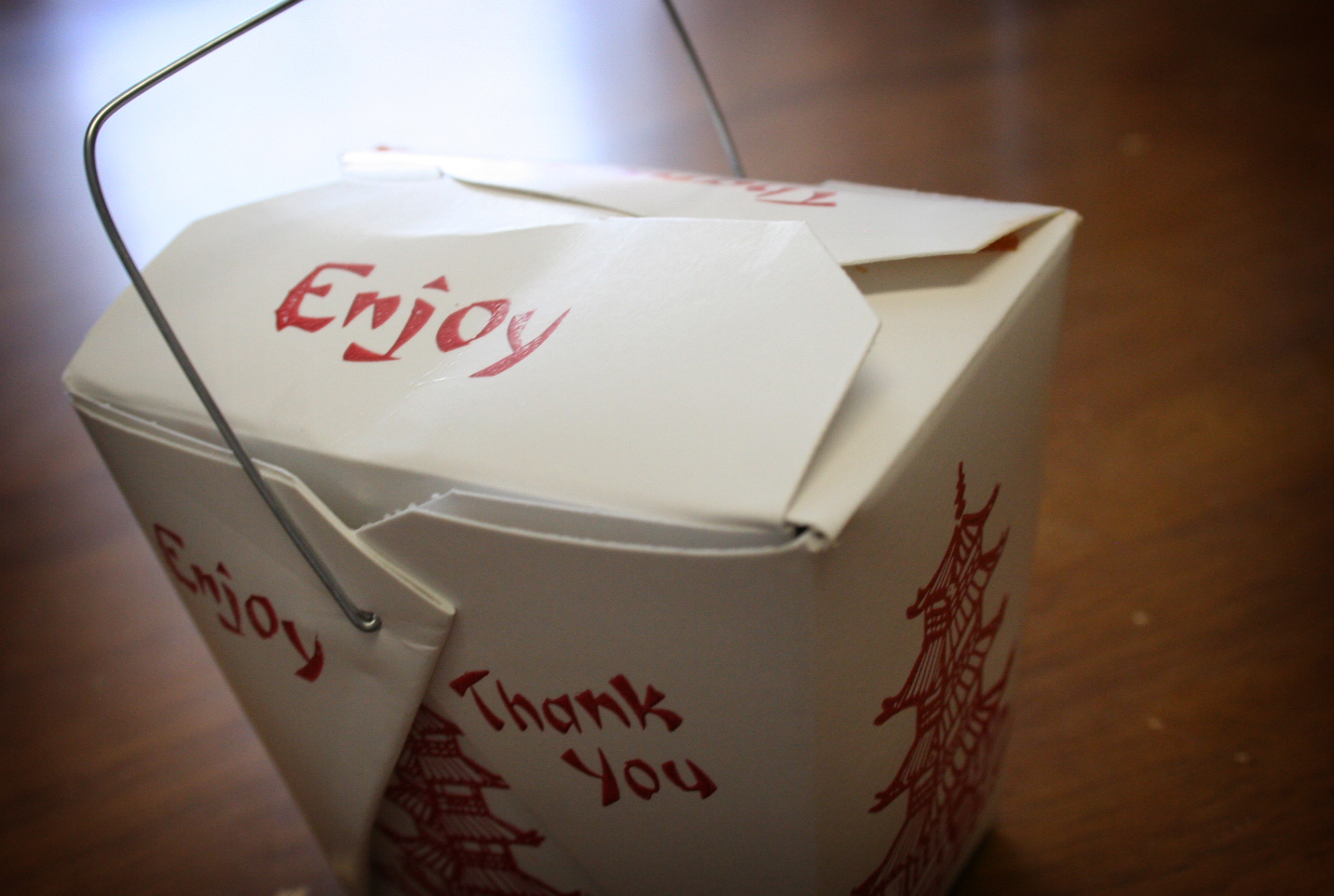
Chinese takeout

Immigration to the United States occurred over time. Historians identify several waves of migration to the United States: one from 1815 to 1860, in which some five million English, Irish, German, Scandinavian, and others from northwestern Europe came to the United States; one from 1865 to 1890, in which some 10 million immigrants, also mainly from northwestern Europe, settled; and a third from 1890 to 1914, in which 15 million immigrants, mainly from central, eastern, and southern Europe (many Austrian, Hungarian, Turkish, Lithuanian, Russian, Jewish, Greek, Italian, and Romanian) settled in the United States.

Together with earlier arrivals to the United States (including the indigenous Native Americans, Hispanic and Latino Americans, particularly in the West, Southwest, and Texas; African Americans who came to the United States in the Atlantic slave trade; and early colonial migrants from Europe), these new waves of immigrants had a profound impact on national or regional cuisine. Some of these more prominent groups include the following:

- Albanian Americans—Albanian cuisine
- Arab Americans, particularly Lebanese Americans (the largest ethnic Arab group in the United States)—Arab cuisine, Lebanese cuisine
- Argentine Americans—Argentine cuisine
- Armenian Americans—Armenian cuisine
- Brazilian Americans—Brazilian cuisine
- Cambodian Americans—Cambodian cuisine
- Chinese Americans—American Chinese cuisine, Chinese cuisine
- Colombian Americans—Colombian cuisine
- Cuban Americans—Cuban cuisine
- Dominican Americans—Dominican Republic cuisine
- Dutch Americans—Dutch cuisine
- Ethiopian Americans—Eritrean Americans: Ethiopian cuisine, Eritrean cuisine in Los Angeles, Washington, D.C., Denver, New York
- Filipino Americans—Filipino cuisine, Filipino-American cuisine
- French Americans—French cuisine
- German Americans—German cuisine (the Pennsylvania Dutch, although descended from Germans, arrived earlier than the bulk of German migrants and have distinct culinary traditions)
- Greek Americans—Greek-American cuisine, Greek cuisine, Mediterranean cuisine
- Guatemalan Americans—Guatemalan cuisine
- Haitian Americans—Haitian cuisine
- Honduran Americans—Honduran cuisine
- Hungarian Americans—Hungarian cuisine
- Indian Americans—Indian cuisine
- Irish Americans—Irish cuisine
- Italian Americans—Italian-American cuisine, Italian cuisine
- Japanese Americans—Japanese cuisine, with influences on the Hawaiian cuisine
- Jewish Americans—Jewish cuisine, with particular influence on New York City cuisine
- Korean Americans—Korean cuisine
- Lithuanian Americans—Lithuanian cuisine, Midwest
- Nicaraguan American—Nicaraguan cuisine
- Nigerian Americans—Nigerian cuisine
- Pakistani Americans—Pakistani cuisine
- Peruvian Americans—Peruvian cuisine
- Polish Americans—Polish cuisine, with particular impact on Midwest
- Polynesian Americans—Hawaiian cuisine
- Portuguese Americans—Portuguese cuisine
- Romanian Americans—Romanian cuisine
- Russian Americans—Russian cuisine, with particular impact on Midwest
- Salvadoran Americans—Salvadoran cuisine
- Scottish Americans—Scottish cuisine
- Spanish Americans—Spanish cuisine
- Thai Americans—Thai cuisine
- Turkish Americans—Turkish cuisine, Balkan cuisine
- Venezuelan Americans—Venezuelan cuisine
- Vietnamese Americans—Vietnamese cuisine
- West Indian Americans—Caribbean cuisine, Jamaican cuisine, Trinidad and Tobago cuisine, Barbadian cuisine, Bahamian cuisine

Italian, Mexican and Chinese (Cantonese) cuisines have indeed joined the mainstream. These three cuisines have become so ingrained in the American culture that they are no longer foreign to the American palate. According to the study, more than nine out of 10 consumers are familiar with and have tried these foods, and about half report eating them frequently. The research also indicates that Italian, Mexican and Chinese (Cantonese) have become so adapted to such an extent that "authenticity" is no longer a concern to customers.

Contributions from these ethnic foods have become as common as traditional "American" fares such as hot dogs, hamburgers, beef steak, which are derived from German cuisine, (chicken-fried steak, for example, is a variation on German schnitzel), cherry pie, Coca-Cola, milkshakes, fried chicken (Fried chicken is of English, Scottish, and African influence), Pepsi, Dr Pepper and so on. Nowadays, Americans also have a ubiquitous consumption of foods like pizza and pasta, tacos and burritos to "General Tso's chicken" and fortune cookies. Fascination with these and other ethnic foods may also vary with region.

== Other popular foods ==
In a 2026 Youguv survey the most popular American foods were French fries, grilled cheese, cheeseburgers, and hamburgers coming joint fourth with mashed potato.

=== Fast food ===
The United States has a large fast food industry. Major American fast food chains include McDonald's, Burger King, Wendy's, Domino's, Pizza Hut, KFC, Popeyes, Subway, Taco Bell, Arby's, Starbucks, Dunkin' Donuts, White Castle, In-N-Out Burger, Sonic Drive-In, Chick-fil-A, Church's Chicken, and Raising Cane's, among numerous other multinational, national, regional, and local chains. Traditional American fast-food items include hamburgers, French fries, breaded chicken, and pizza. However, several chains also offer items from other cuisines adapted for American palates, such as tacos, pasta, and stir-fry. Many American fast-food chains have expanded into other countries, typically offering standard American fare alongside items adapted to regional tastes.

=== Desserts ===
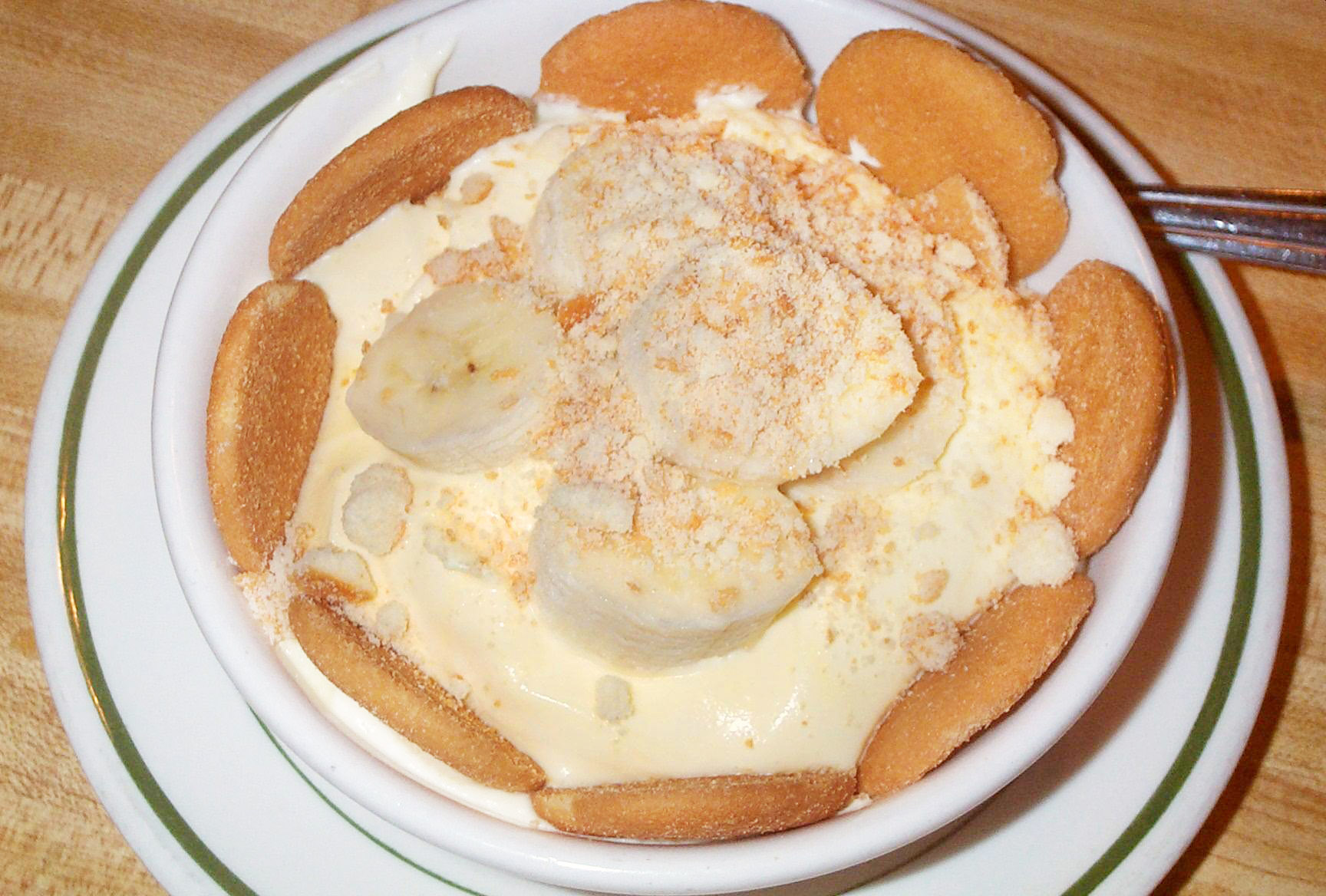
Banana pudding

A popular dessert enjoyed in America is apple pie. Some other American desserts are banana split, Boston cream pie, key lime pie, and bananas foster. Other desserts that are popular in America are chocolate chip cookies, pecan pie, carrot cake, banana pudding, S'more, black and white cookies, pumpkin pie, coconut cake, funnel cake, brownies and red velvet cake.

== Influential figures and American cuisine on television ==
American chefs have been influential in both the food industry and popular culture. Some important 19th-century American chefs include Charles Ranhofer of Delmonico's Restaurant in New York, and Bob Payton, who is credited with bringing American-style pizza to the UK. Later, chefs Charles Scotto, Louis Pacquet, John Massironi were founded the American Culinary Federation in 1930, taking after similar organizations across Europe. In the 1940s, Chef James Beard hosted the first nationally televised cooking show, I Love to Eat. His name is also carried by the foundation and the prestigious cooking award that recognizes excellence in the American culinary community.

Since Beard, many chefs and cooking personalities have taken to television. The success of the Cooking Channel and Food Network has contributed to the popularity of American cuisine. In 1946, the Culinary Institute of America was founded by Katharine Angel and Frances Roth. This would become the United States' most prestigious culinary school, where many of the most talented American chefs would study before successful careers. The American Culinary community has grown due to both restaurants and media, through the work of many talented chefs.

=== Influential figures ===
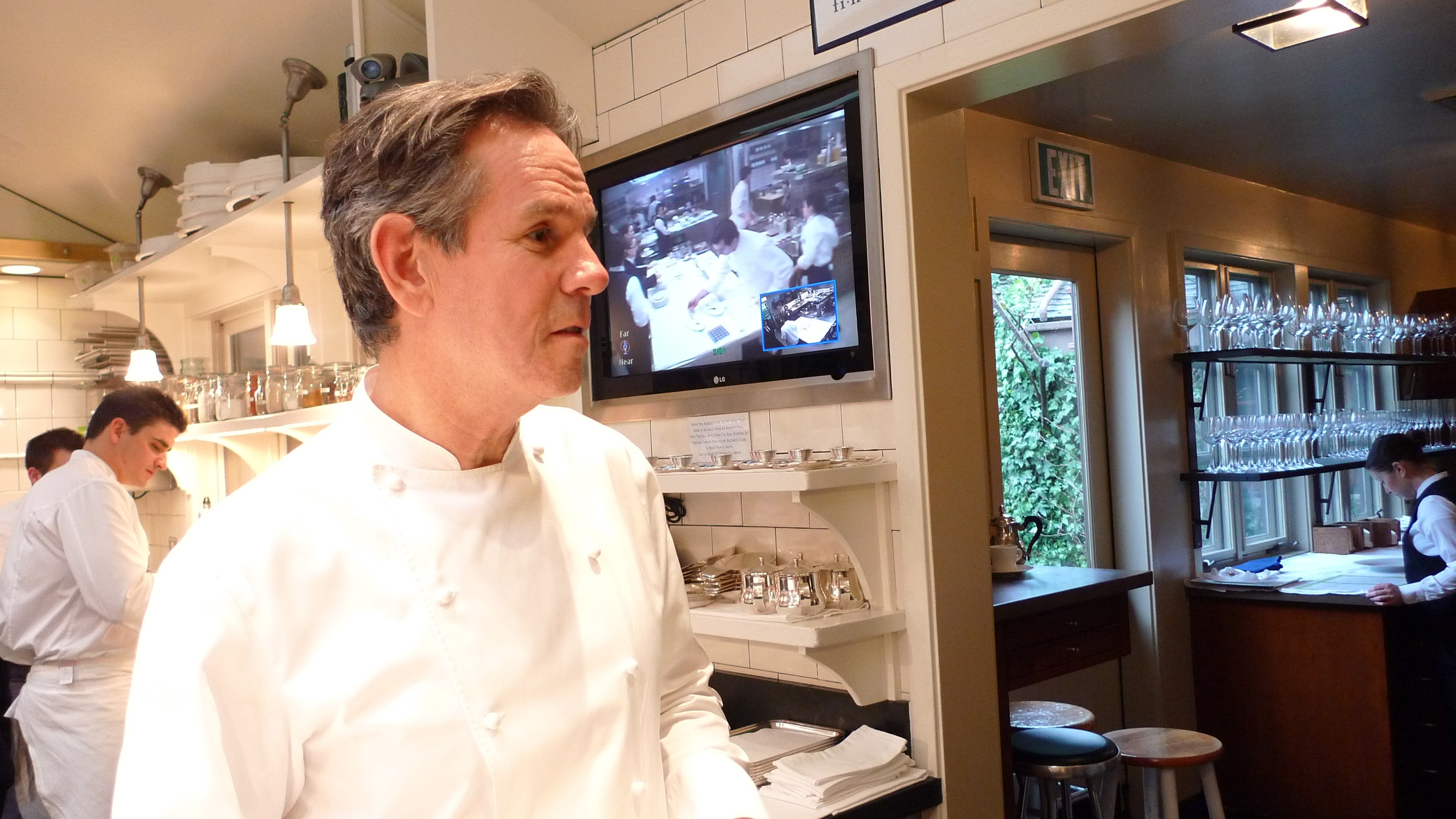
Thomas Keller at The French Laundry

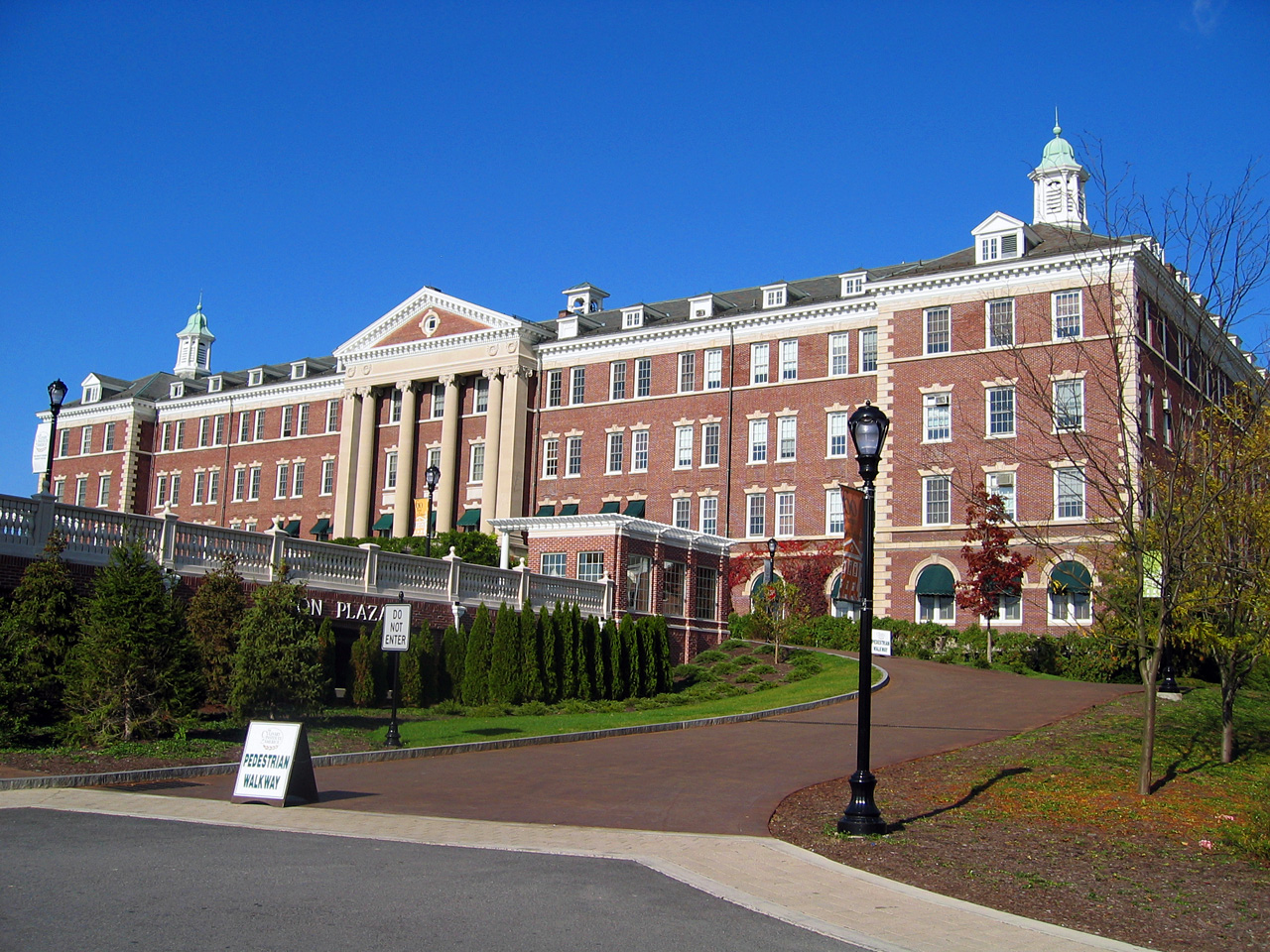
Culinary Institute of America

Notable American restaurant chefs include Samin Nosrat (Salt, Fat, Acid, Heat), Thomas Keller (The French Laundry), Charlie Trotter (Trotter's), Grant Achatz (Alinea), Alfred Portale (Portale), Paul Prudhomme (K-Paul's), Paul Bertolli (Oliveto), Jonathan Waxman (Barbuto), Mark Peel (Campanile), Frank Stitt (Bottega), Alice Waters (Chez Panisse), Wolfgang Puck (Spago), Patrick O'Connell (The Inn), Eric Ripert (Le Bernardin), Todd English (Olives) and Anthony Bourdain (Les Halles). Many of these chefs have received widespread critical acclaim, as Keller, Achatz, Ripert, and O'Connell have all earned three Michelin stars, the highest distinction a restaurant can receive. Keller was given this award for The French Laundry, Achatz for Alinea, Ripert for Le Bernardin and O'Connell for The Inn at Little Washington.

Celebrity chefs have also helped to expand the culinary arts into popular culture, with chefs such as David Chang (Chef's Table), Alton Brown (Iron Chef America), Emeril Lagasse (Emeril Live), Cat Cora (Iron Chef America), Erik Davidson (Phat Erik's), Michael Symon (The Chew), Bobby Flay (Beat Bobby Flay), Ina Garten (Barefoot Contessa), Adam Richman (Man v. Food), and Guy Fieri (Diners, Drive-ins and Dives). Many of these celebrity chefs, such as David Chang, Emeril Lagasse and Bobby Flay began their careers in restaurants before branching out into television. The shows have a wide variety of formats, including cooking competitions, such as Iron Chef, documentaries, such as Anthony Bourdain's Parts Unknown, shows that take a look into restaurants, as Chef's Table does, and shows that teach cooking. The success of food television, particularly in the United States, has helped American Cuisine grow worldwide.

=== Regional cuisine chefs ===
Regional chefs are emerging as localized celebrity chefs with growing broader appeal, such as Peter Merriman (Hawaii Regional Cuisine), Roy Choi (Korean American Cuisine), Jerry Traunfeld, Alan Wong (Pacific Rim cuisine), Rick Bayless and Daniela Soto-Innes (traditional Mexican cuisine with modern interpretations), Norman Van Aken (New World Cuisine – fusion Latin, Caribbean, Asian, African and American), and Mark Miller (American Southwest cuisine).

== See also ==
- History of food
- Cuisine of the Americas
  - Indigenous cuisine of the Americas

=== Types ===
- American wine

=== Regional ===
- Cuisine of California
- Cuisine of Minnesota
- Cuisine of New England
- Cuisine of New York City
- Cuisine of the Southern United States
  - Cuisine of Atlanta
  - Cuisine of Houston
  - Cuisine of Kentucky
- Tex-Mex cuisine

=== Ethnic ===
- American Chinese cuisine
- Mexican-American cuisine
- Italian-American cuisine
- Greek-American cuisine
- Puerto Rican cuisine
- Tlingit cuisine

=== Other ===
- High on the Hog: How African American Cuisine Transformed America
- Cuisine of Antebellum America
- List of American desserts
- List of American breads
  - Bread in American cuisine
- List of American foods
- List of American regional and fusion cuisines
- List of American breakfast foods
- Cuisine of the Americas
- Cuisine of the Pennsylvania Dutch
- Cuisine of the Southern United States
- Culture of Guam § Cuisine
- American tea culture
