= List of American regional and fusion cuisines =

Below is a list of regional dishes which together form the Cuisine of the United States.

== Ethnic and religious ==
- American Chinese cuisine
- The Halal Guys (American Halal)
- American Jewish cuisine
- Filipino-American cuisine
- Greek-American cuisine
- Indigenous cuisine of the Americas
- Italian-American cuisine
- Mexican-American cuisine
- Cuisine of the Seventh Day Adventists
- Soul food

== Fusion cuisines ==
- Appalachian cuisine- is a style of cuisine located in the central and southern sections of the Appalachian Mountains. It is an amalgam of the diverse foodways, specifically among the British, German and Italian immigrant population, the Cherokee people, and African-Americans, as well as their descendants in the Appalachia region.
- Lowcountry cuisine - is traditionally associated with the South Carolina Lowcountry and the Georgia coast. While it shares features with Southern cooking, its geography, economics, demographics, and culture pushed its culinary identity in a different direction from regions above the Fall Line.
- Rocky Mountain cuisine - is a cuisine of Alberta and British Columbia in Canada; Idaho, Colorado, Wyoming, Utah and Montana in the United States.

== Holidays ==
- American Christmas dishes
- American Thanksgiving

== Regional ==
=== Mid-Atlantic United States ===
This region encompasses the cuisines of the states of New York, New Jersey, Pennsylvania, Delaware, and Maryland, as well as Washington, D.C. The influences on cuisine in this region of the United States are extremely eclectic as it has been, and continues to be, a gateway for international culture as well as a gateway for new immigrants.

- Cuisine of New Jersey
- Cuisine of New York City
- Cuisine of Philadelphia
- Cuisine of the Pennsylvania Dutch

=== Midwestern United States ===
This region draws its culinary roots most significantly from the cuisines of Central, Northern and Eastern Europe, and Indigenous cuisine of the Americas.

  - Cuisine of Chicago - Chicago-style hot dog and Chicago-style pizza
  - Cuisine of Cincinnati - Cincinnati chili
  - Cuisine of Michigan
  - Cuisine of Minnesota
  - Iron Range cuisine
  - Cuisine of Ohio
  - Cuisine of Omaha
  - Cuisine of St. Louis
  - Cuisine of Wisconsin

=== New England ===
This region traces its roots to traditional English cuisine and Native American cuisine of the Abenaki, Narragansett, Niantic, Wabanaki, Wampanoag, and other native peoples. It also includes influences from Irish, French, Italian, and Portuguese cuisine, among others.

  - Cuisine of Boston - Boston baked beans
  - Cuisine of Rhode Island
  - Cuisine of Vermont

=== Southern United States ===
This region traces its roots to traditional Indigenous cuisine of the Americas (e.g., Cherokee, Caddo, Choctaw, and Seminole), English cuisine, the cuisines of enslaved Africans trafficked to the North American colonies through the Atlantic slave trade, French cuisine, Cuban cuisine, and Spanish cuisine.

  - Cuisine of Atlanta
  - Cajun cuisine- is a style of cooking that incorporated West African, French and Spanish cooking techniques into Acadian cuisine.
  - Louisiana Creole cuisine - is a style of cooking which blends West African, French, Spanish, and Native American influences
  - Floribbean - refers to a fusion cuisine found in Florida. It is influenced by Caribbean cuisine, Cuban cuisine, Jamaican cuisine, Puerto Rican cuisine, Haitian cuisine, and Bahamian cuisine.
  - Cuisine of Houston
  - Cuisine of Kentucky
  - Cuisine of New Orleans - this cuisine is heavily influenced by Creole cuisine, Cajun cuisine, and soul food.
  - Soul food -refers to the cuisines of enslaved Africans trafficked to the North American colonies through the Atlantic slave trade during the Antebellum period. The expression "soul food" originated in the mid-1960s, when "soul" was a common word used to describe African-American culture.

=== Southwestern United States ===
This region traces its roots to Spanish cuisine, Native American cuisine, Mexican cuisine, and cowboy cuisine. Its boundaries extend through Arizona, New Mexico, Texas and includes portions of California, Colorado, Nevada, and Utah.

  - New Mexican cuisine- refers to the cuisine of New Mexico, known for its fusion of Pueblo Native American cuisine with Hispano Spanish and Mexican cuisine originating in Nuevo México
  - Santa Maria–style barbecue - refers to a culinary tradition rooted in the Santa Maria Valley in Santa Barbara County on the Central Coast of California.
  - Tex-Mex - refers to a cuisine that derives from the culinary creations of the Tejano people of Texas.

=== Western United States ===
- Cuisine of California - This region is influenced largely by Hispanic American roots (Mexican, Latin American, Spanish), alongside East Asian and Oceanian influences (Japanese, Chinese, Korean, Filipino, Vietnamese, Thai, Hawaiian), and Western European influences (Italian, French, Portuguese), as well as the food trends and traditions of larger American cuisine.
  - California cuisine - a food movement that originated in Northern California (see: Alice Waters). The cuisine focuses on dishes that are driven by local and sustainable ingredients with an attention to seasonality and an emphasis on the bounty of the region. French cuisine, American cuisine, Italian cuisine, Mexican cuisine, Chinese cuisine, and Japanese cuisine have all influenced Californian fusion cuisine. It is also related to the Culinary Revolution of the 1970s.
- Cuisine of Hawaii - This region draws from the fusion of the cuisines of Polynesian voyagers, Native Hawaiians, Europeans, and Americans. As pineapple and sugarcane plantations grew, so did the demand for labor, bringing many immigrant groups to the Islands between 1850 and 1930. Immigrant workers brought cuisines from China, Korea, Japan, the Philippines, Puerto Rico and Portugal after arriving in Hawaii, introducing their new foods and influencing the region.
- Pacific Northwest cuisine - This region covers Oregon, Washington and Alaska, as well as the province of British Columbia and the southern portion of the territory of Yukon. This cuisine reflects the ethnic makeup of the region, with noticeable influence from Asian and Native American traditions.

== See also ==
- List of diners
- New American cuisine
- Puerto Rican cuisine
- Western pattern diet

Historical

- Chuckwagon
- Cuisine of the Thirteen Colonies
