= Cuisine of the Western United States =

Culinary traditions in the Western United States

The Western United States has its cuisine, distinct in various ways from that of the rest of the country. States west of Texas, Kansas, Missouri, and Nebraska would be considered part of this area, as would, in some cases, western parts of adjoining states.

The locavore movement is increasingly influential, as is the concept of sustainability. The influence of the Native American cultures of each area, but especially in the Northwest and in Navajo country, is important in the cuisine picture of the Western United States.

== Overview ==
In the Northwest, Oregon, and Washington, various specialties involving salmon, perhaps grilled over a wood fire, and such naturally occurring foodstuffs as blackberries and mushrooms may often be served in forms close to those in which they naturally occur as regional cuisine. The bounty of the land and those things the hunter-gatherers and fishermen found in abundance are major influences.

In the Mountain States, such as Utah, Montana, Idaho, New Mexico, Nevada, Colorado and Wyoming, cowboy/ranch culture is a factor, and variations on the beef theme, outdoor cooking, and such events as chuckwagon dinners abound on dude ranches and at other tourist locations.

Hunting is still important in the West, and wild game is part of the cuisine. Rocky Mountain oysters are certainly a part of Western regional food served up for the delight of squeamish tourists.

A growing wine industry is of great importance along the West Coast and increasingly important inland and to the north, not only in California. Along the coast, seafood is important.

The evolution of California cuisine and the influence of Alice Waters are major factors in what could be called the regional cuisine of the West. The slow food and local food movements are parts of this phenomenon.

The influence of the Pacific Rim is huge along the coast, and fusion cuisine, along with interesting Asian-influenced and Mexican-influenced drinks, has become extremely popular.

Near Mexico, with the culture of Mexico spreading as workers move farther from the border, the influence of that country is important in food. The food of other Latin-American countries can also be found and is increasingly an influence, with the food described as Nuevo Latino more and more often seen.

Throughout the West in areas where sheep ranching/sheep herding is important (Idaho, Montana, Wyoming, Nevada, eastern Washington, eastern California, other nearby states) restaurants featuring Basque cuisine can be found. They are usually family-style, featuring large tables where diners sit with other parties and share serving dishes which are passed around the table.

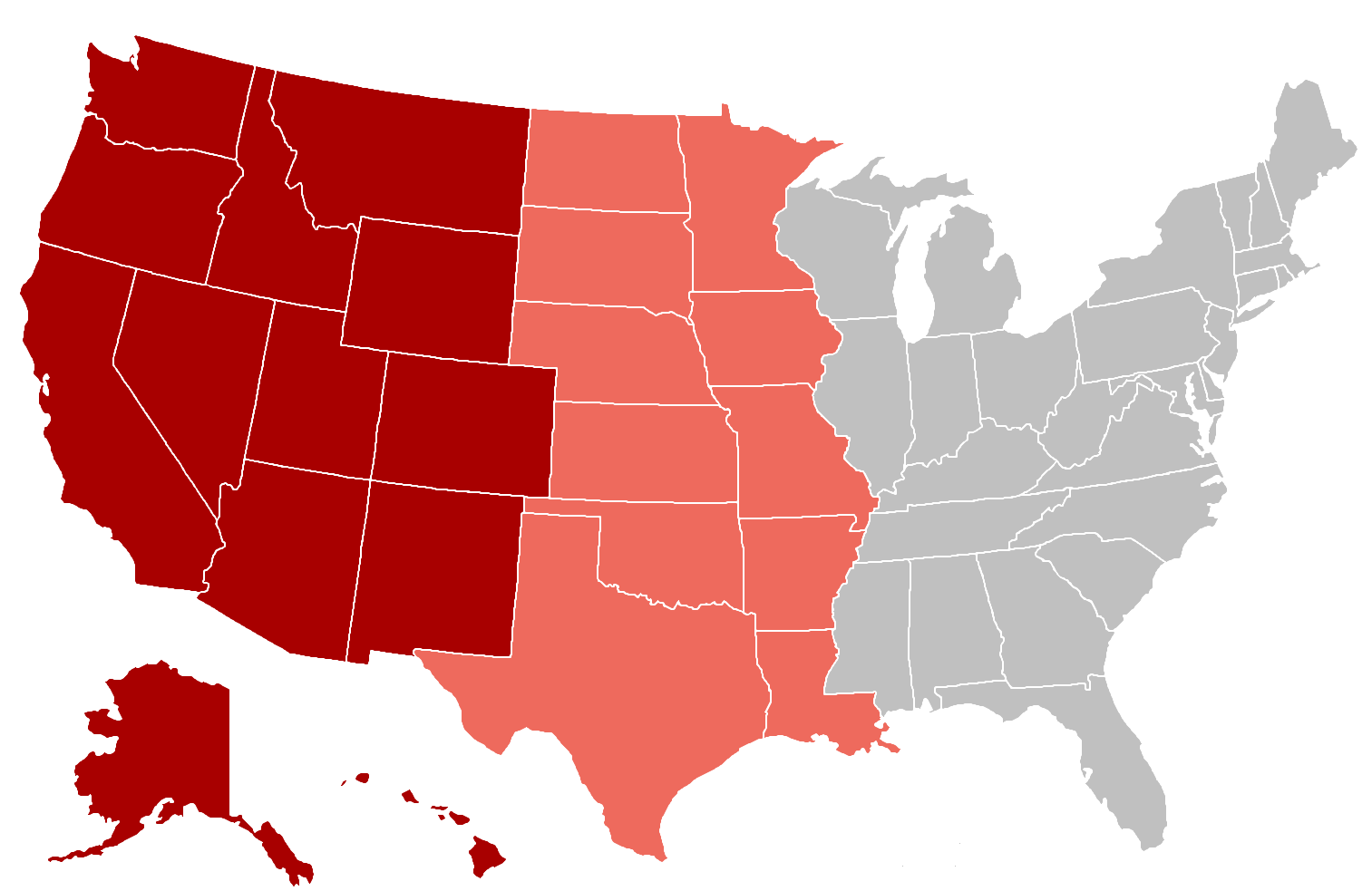
Regional definitions vary from source to source. As defined by the Census Bureau, the western United States includes 13 states: Alaska, Arizona, California, Colorado, Hawaii, Idaho, Montana, Nevada, New Mexico, Oregon, Utah, Washington, and Wyoming. In turn, this region is sub-divided into Mountain and Pacific areas. The states in light red are sometimes considered "western", although they are often grouped with separate regions such as the Midwest and the South

== California ==
California cuisine is heavily influenced by Mexican, Asian, and Mediterranean cuisine. Wraps, burritos, tacos, sushi and salads such as Greek, Cobb, and Asian chicken salad can be found on many restaurant menus, and avocado is used as a common ingredient due to its widespread cultivation in the state.

Californian cuisine tends to reflect the lighter and more health conscious mindset of the state. Chicken, turkey, and soy are more prevalent in Californian dishes than beef or pork.

== See also ==
- Alice Waters and Chez Panisse
- Chuckwagon
- Cuisine of California and California Cuisine
- Culinary revolution
- Fusion cuisine
- Local food and Locavore
- Mormon foodways
- Native American cuisine
- New American cuisine
- New Mexican cuisine
- Pacific Northwest cuisine
- Rocky Mountain Oysters
- Sunset (magazine)
- Wine Country (California)
