= Skoff =

Skoff is a surname. Notable people with the surname include:

- Gail Skoff (born 1949), American photographer
- Horst Skoff (1968–2008), Austrian tennis player
- Patrick Skoff, American artist

== See also ==
- Skaff (disambiguation), another surname
