= Gail Skoff =

American photographer

- Born: September 27, 1949 (age 76); Los Angeles
- Occupation: Photographer
- Spouse: Kermit Lynch

Gail Skoff is a photographer known for her handcolored prints. Much of her work focuses on landscapes and food. She was a 1976 recipient of a fellowship from the National Endowment for the Arts, and several of the prints resulting from fellowship are held by the Smithsonian American Art Museum. Her works are also held at the Biblioteque Nationale in Paris, the Center for Creative Photography in Tucson, and the Oakland Museum of California.

== Biography ==
Skoff attended the San Francisco Art Institute, where she earned a Bachelor of Fine Arts degree in 1972 and a Master of Fine Arts degree in 1979. She received a $7,500 National Endowment for the Arts Visual Artists Fellowship in 1976.

She is married to wine-buyer Kermit Lynch; they have two children. They live in Berkeley, California and Provence.

== Artwork ==
Skoff's early work involved hand-tinted photographs of costumed models. Examples of this early work were published in The Photographers' Choice (1975), a portfolio of work recommended by photographers of recognized talent, including both well known artists such as Harry Callahan and Wynn Bullock as well as lesser-known artists including Skoff. She described the goal of this work as "the magical transformation of reality" and creating a "spirit of timelessness, mystery, and romance." Critic Hal Fischer described the effect of her efforts as being "temporally disjunctive," calling her a "contemporary photographer with a 19th-century attitude." Skoff has cited as influences Julia Margaret Cameron and early 20th century Pictorialists.

During her 1976 NEA fellowship, Skoff travelled to Bali, with a particular aim to make the photos appear timeless, keeping the photos free of anything that hinted at a particular time. These photos were also handcolored.

An exhibit at Quindacqua Ltd. in Washington, DC in 1977 mostly featured photos taken in Paris. A review in The Washington Post Magazine noted her work as an excellent example of handcoloring, and described the work's "Pre-Raphaelite look: romantic and soft, some dim and vague, others glowing as if they were lit from behind rather than painted."

Skoff first explored landscape photography on a trip to Hawaii, and visited the Desert Southwest in 1978 in search of uninhabited landscapes to work with. She contributed to a two-year touring exhibit of national park photography curated by Robert Cahn and Robert Ketchum from 1979 to 1981. Writing about the catalogue for that exhibit, The New York Times described Skoff's contributions to the show as "pictures with arbitrary and whimsical colors" that are "removed from the veneration of the landscape one finds in Adams and Porter." Of Skoff's hand-colored landscape photos, Jussim and Lindquist-Cock raise the question "what degree of color manipulation removes a print from 'photography' and places it in 'graphic arts.'"

Skoff contributed handcolored photos to Reclaiming Paradise: American Women Photograph the Land, a traveling exhibit from the Tweed Art Museum in Duluth, Minnesota, featuring landscapes by 20 female photographers. Writing about the exhibit for The New York Times, Vivien Raynor described "Utah", which she called the best of Skoff's three entries, as "crackled like the surfaces of old paintings... a metaphor for human flesh by the addition of rose pink and highlights of silver grey." Hal Fischer said that her Utah landscapes "[achieve] a form that is startlingly modern, bringing to mind the unrealities of NASA's satellite pictures of earth."

Since the late 1980s, Skoff has provided photographs for several food and wine books, including books by her husband, wine buyer Kermit Lynch. and by chef Alice Waters, Writing for Aperture, critic and gallery-owner Frish Brandt reviewed Alice Water's Chez Panisse Cooking as a collection of photographs, describing the photos as "a visual poem" and likening Skoff's treatment of bread to landscape photography. A review of Lynch's book Inspiring Thirst notes the "evocative black-and-white photography of the French and Italian vignerons, vineyards, landscapes and food."

In her book A Taste for Provence, food historian Helen Lefkowitz Horowitz tells of a collaboration between Alice Waters, Kermit Lynch, food writer Richard Olney, and Gail Skoff that resulted in the 1994 publication of an illustrated cookbook Lulu's provenc̜al table : the exuberant food and wine from Domaine Tempier Vineyard. Horowitz writes that Skoff's photographs give the book its "dramatic presentation." A reviewer for The Observer called Skoff's work on the book "breathtakingly beautiful."

Skoff's food art has appeared in both art magazines and food magazines. The cover of Gastronomica's Fall 2002 issue featured Skoff's photograph of a man eating a tomato with hards covered in dirt. The image inspired strong reactions, both positive and negative. A Los Angeles bookstore returned all of their copies of the issue because some customers were offended by the image. (Whether they were offended by the dirt, the sensuality of the image, or some other offense was unclear.) Of the image, the magazine's editor, Darra Goldstein wrote "Here is the image to reconnect us with the soil, to celebrate the organic, to remind us of the sensual pleasure of biting into an utterly ripe tomato." She wrote that "many readers... found the image joyful in its evocation of summer warmth and bounty."

== Books ==
=== Books illustrated with Skoff's photographs ===
- Adventures on the Wine Route: A Wine Buyer's Tour of France (1988)
- Chez Panisse Cooking (1988)
- Lulu's Provenc̜al Table : The Exuberant Food and Wine from Domaine Tempier Vineyard (1994)
- Cooking By Hand (2003)
- Inspiring Thirst: Vintage Selections from the Kermit Lynch Wine Brochure (2004)

=== Catalogues and collections including Skoff's works ===
- Celebrations (1974)
- The Photographers' Choice: A Book of Portfolios and Critical Opinion (1975)
- New Landscapes (1981)
- Landscape as Photograph (1985)
- Reclaiming paradise : American women photograph the land (1987)

=== Selected solo exhibitions ===
- Introductions '74, Phoenix Gallery, San Francisco (1974)
- American Cultural Center, Paris (1977)
- Washington State University, Pullman (1978)
- Simon Lowinsky Gallery, San Francisco (1980)
- Equivalents Gallery, Seattle (1982)
- Jones Troyer Gallery, Washington DC (1984)
