= Shree Thaker Bhojanalay =

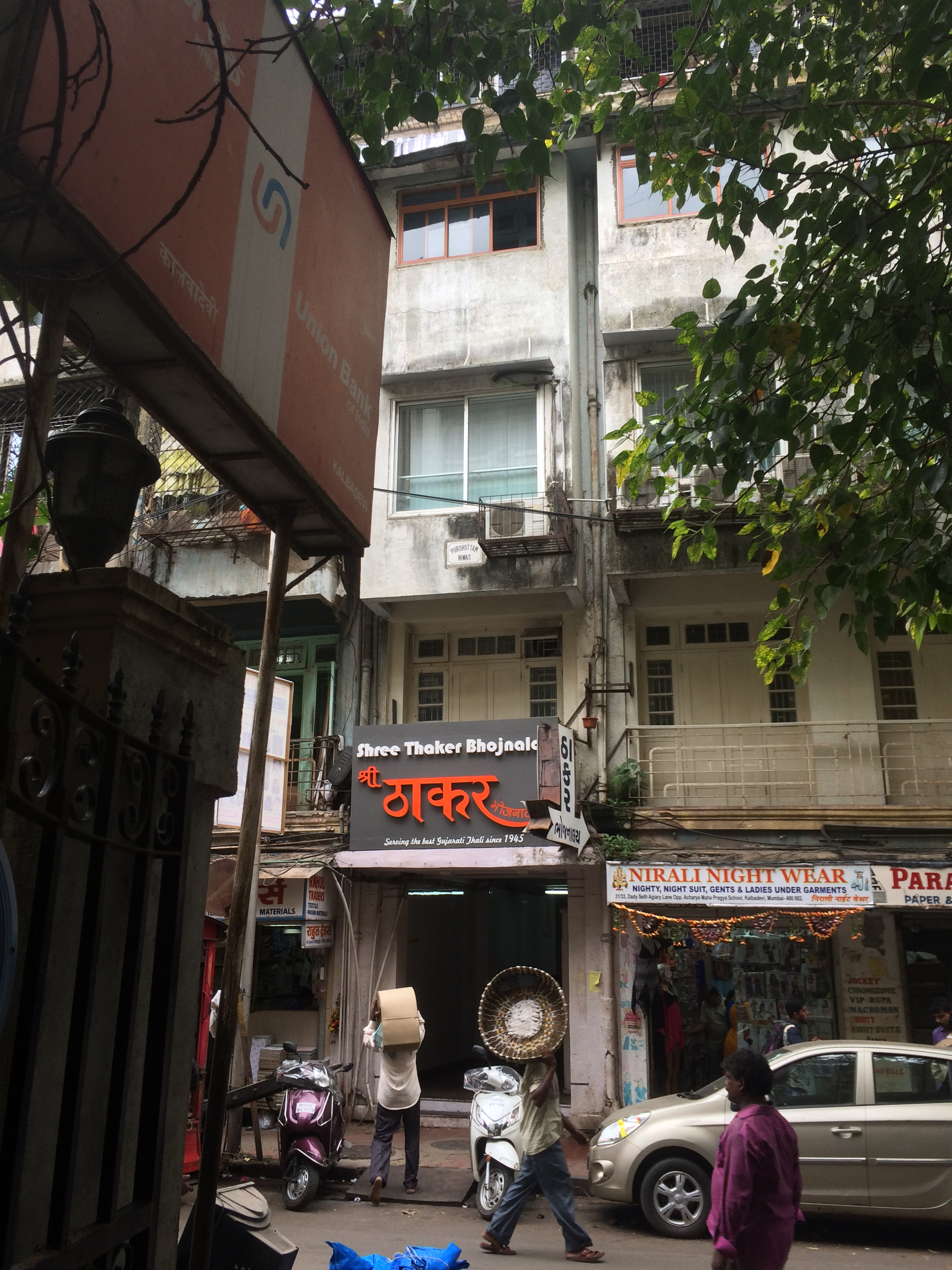
Entrance to Shree Thaker Bhojanalay

Shree Thaker Bhojanalay is a Mumbai eating house that serves a Gujarati thali. It is located in Fanaswadi, Kalbadevi. It was established in 1945 by Maganlal Purohit. It is owned by Gautam Purohit, who is also the head chef. The Bhojanalay is where Alice Waters is reported to have eaten a jowar bhakri for the first time.

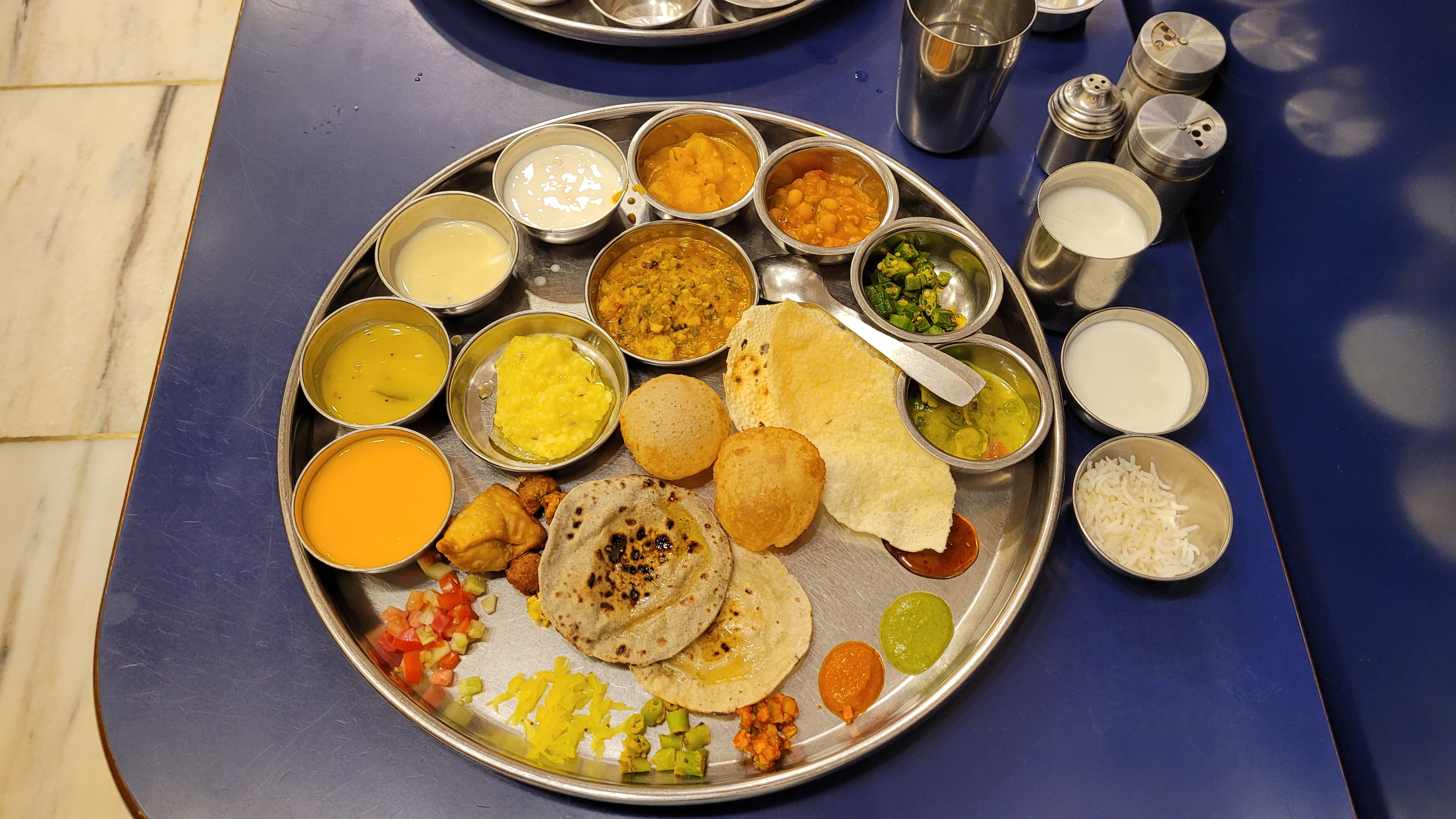
Gujarati Thali At Shree Thaker Bhojanalay

== Menu and ambience ==
Food critic Meera Sodhi mentions barefoot waiters who coax the patrons to eat more, which she says reminded her of her mother. Kunal Vijaykar characterises the "unlimited thali" meal here as "royal", that includes bottomless glass of buttermilk, an assortment of various types of farsan and other starters, dhoklas in different colours, bhajis made from potato, fenugreek, chilies and more, sweet and hot chutneys, rotlis, rotlas, bhakris and bhakras, puris and puran polis, with vegetable and pulse preparations made from bottle gourd, ivy gourd, cow peas, green gram, both dry and with gravy, spicy, sweet or raw, sweet dal, kadhi, lackho dal rice, pulao khichdi, papad, pickle and a minimum of two sweets. Rahul Akrekar describes the food as simple and honest. The offerings have been called so numerous that one loses count. Another writes that the thali includes "unlimited quantities of farsan, veggies, rotis, pulao, dal, kadhi, buttermilk and creamy shrikhand." Christien Manfield finds the ambience "modest", like that of a "worker's canteen", where "friendly staff insist on constantly refilling plates," and an unmatched choice of bhakris and rotis, with main and side dishes like corn dhokla, aloo rasawala and vegetable pulao. The Penguin Food guide to India tells readers that the place is "tough to find' and the entrance "dingy", but the food good, the early winter thali had undhiyu, a vegetable salad, rice slow cooked with spices, dahi, bhakris of corn and millet, kheer and chaas.

== Reactions from food critics ==
Christine Manfield finds the Bhojanalay "city's hidden gem" serving what is considered one of Mumbai's best vegetarian thali. Elle writes that the Bhojanalay is a must visit eatery for vegetarians in Mumbai, one of the world's 8 most vegetarian cities. Ashwin Sanghi calls the Bhojanalay thali, Mumbai's best Gujarati thali. Rachel Goenka mentions the Bhojanalay as one that is a defining part of Mumbai's diverse food culture. The Bhojanalay was short listed amongst the top three for TripAdvisor 2016 Travellers’ Choice Awards in local cuisine category. The Bhojanalay finds mention in The Penguin food guide to India. The Bhojanalay features on various must "best in Mumbai" lists, such as

- "11 Places You Have To Eat At In Mumbai If Sunday Brunch Is What You're After"
- "7 must visit Gujarati – Rajasthani Thali Restaurants"
- "Kunal Vijayakar picks the best places to savour an unlimited thali in Mumbai"
- "Here Are The 22 Best Thalis In Mumbai For The Ultimate Feast!"
- "Food: 5 restaurants in Mumbai that serve lip smacking Gujarati thalis"
- "With more than 70 years in service, Shree Thaker Bhojanalay is an eatery loved by all serving authentic Gujarati Thali"

== Coverage in the media ==
The Bhojanalay featured in ABP Majha's programme "Chavdar Chavistha".
