= Culinary Revolution =

American culinary movement during the late 1960s and 1970s

The Culinary Revolution was a movement during the late 1960s and 1970s, when sociopolitical issues began to profoundly affect the way Americans eat. The Culinary Revolution is often credited to Alice Waters, the owner of Chez Panisse restaurant in Berkeley, California.

However, such claims are sometimes contested and the movement attributed to collaborations of other individuals. The mantra of using fresh, local, and seasonal ingredients at Waters's Chez Panisse, as well as other similar "New American cuisine" restaurants, has greatly changed food served in restaurants and at home, thus creating California Cuisine and a broader movement in the cuisine of the United States.

== Alice Waters ==
A member of Berkely's Free Speech Movement, Waters developed a new view of the importance of food during her first trip to France in 1965. She began to see that some of her peers deprived themselves of good food. Waters is known to believe that

"It's not enough to liberate yourself politically, to liberate yourself sexually—you have to liberate all the senses." She believed that eating together was a socially progressive act, one that was under threat from the fifties American—TV, frozen-food culture.

Waters introduced to America many foods that today may seem commonplace, such as salads of mixed greens.

We were doing those very early on. I think lettuce was my first passion. I was bringing seeds over in the early 70s from France and planting them in my backyard, wanting a French kind of salad, with frisée and mâche. I'm sure I have contributed to the awful demise of the concept of mesclun, just by promoting it in many, many, many ways. And now, of course, one of those big companies has grabbed onto the idea, and they cut up big lettuces and put them in a bag, mix them up, and call them mesclun. Who is it—Dole pineapple or somebody?

== Chez Panisse ==
Chez Panisse, established in 1971, is considered to be one of the most influential dining establishments in the United States. This was the public venue in which Waters could put her culinary ideals into practice, using fresh, local, and seasonal ingredients. The restaurant established working relationships with local farmers and suppliers in order to do so. It also launched the careers of many notable chefs, including Jeremiah Tower, and Paul Bertolli.

== Counter-claim ==
Jeremiah Tower has often credited Alice Waters with the invention of the then "new" style of "California Cuisine". He left Chez Panisse in 1977 and began an important career on his own. From 1978 to 1981 he worked at other Northern California restaurants, like Ventana in Big Sur and Balboa Cafe in San Francisco. He also taught briefly at the California Culinary Academy during the school's earlier years, around 1978.

Tower opened his own restaurant, the widely acclaimed Stars in San Francisco; it was a business partnership with the same investors involved in another popular restaurant called Santa Fe Bar and Grill in Berkeley, California. Tower knew the chef who opened Santa Fe Bar and Grill, as he was a former colleague at Chez Panisse.

Tower has criticized Waters for taking most, if not all, the praise and credit for the acclaim of Chez Panisse; furthermore, he seems to criticize her for taking credit for the primary leadership in the new California Cuisine movement and the American Culinary Revolution.

He also questions Waters' role as an actual chef in the kitchen, implying that she has not cooked in years, and also her role in the restaurant altogether.

Tower has written about these issues in his book, California Dish: What I saw (and cooked) at the American Culinary Revolution (2003), quoting many of his peers from Chez Panisse for support. Many of them have since gone on to other ventures, much as Tower himself has done, popular and prolific in the ongoing development of the new California Cuisine or "New American Classics" to which Tower refers.

Tower is praised for his contributions by various popular chefs, among them Sara Moulton and Jacques Pépin. On the back cover of California Dish the following quotations appear:

The food of Jeremiah Tower has always satisfied my belly and my soul. He was there from the start and is more qualified than anyone else to tell the story of the American food revolution of the last thirty years

—Jacques Pépin

California Dish delivers on the double meaning implicit in its title—it serves up a longtime insider's juicy perspective on the key players of the American culinary revolution...

—Sara Moulton

== See also ==
- Cuisine of the United States
- Local food and Locavore
- California cuisine and Cuisine of California
- Alice Waters

== Sources ==
- Bertoli, Paul and Alice Waters. Chez Panisse Cooking. New York: Random House, 1988. ISBN 0-394-55908-8.
- Tower, Jeremiah. California Dish: What I Saw (and Cooked) at the American Culinary Revolution. New York: Free Press, 2003. ISBN 0-7432-2844-8, ISBN 0-7432-2845-6.
- Tower, Jeremiah. New American Classics. New York: Harper and Row, 1986.
