= Richard Olney (food writer) =

American painter, cook, food writer, editor, and memoirist (1927–1999)

- Born: April 12, 1927; Marathon, Iowa, U.S.
- Died: August 3, 1999 (aged 72); Solliès-Toucas, France
- Occupations: Painter; cook; food writer; editor; memoirist
- Known for: Books on French cooking

Richard Olney (April 12, 1927 – August 3, 1999) was an American painter, cook, food writer, editor, and memoirist, best known for his books of French country cooking.

== Biography ==
Olney was born in Marathon, Iowa. He lived in a house above the village of Solliès-Toucas in Provence, France, for most of his adult life, where he wrote many classic and influential cookbooks of French country cooking. He had first moved to France in 1951, to Paris, where he was close friends with (and painted many of) the American and English bohemian expatriate set, including James Baldwin, filmmaker Kenneth Anger, painter John Craxton, poet John Ashbery, and composer Ned Rorem.

His knowledge of traditional classic French food and wine got him a job writing a column entitled Un Américain (gourmand) à Paris for the journal Cuisine et Vins de France beginning in 1962. After The French Menu Cookbook was published in English in 1970, his then-revolutionary approach of seasonal menus and close attention to wine pairings began to attract notice in Britain and America.

Alice Waters, of Chez Panisse restaurant in Berkeley, California, and Kermit Lynch, the Berkeley wine writer and retailer, were both disciples. He introduced Lynch to many French wine growers, including Lucien and Lulu Peyraud of Domaine Tempier, who were then re-establishing the Bandol AOC as a vineyard area of the first rank. James Beard was an important American mentor, and Olney, in the midst of his career, taught a series of cooking classes in Beard's West Village apartment. Despite this, Olney, in a memoir, presents a mixed picture of Beard's character.

From 1977 to 1982, Olney edited the 28-volume Time-Life book series The Good Cook. By the time of his death, from heart failure, in addition to the Time-Life set he had written many of his own books about food and wine. His last book, Reflexions, a memoir, was published posthumously by Brick Tower Press. Olney died aged 72 in Solliès-Toucas.

The Observer Food Monthly panel of chefs, cooks, writers and restaurateurs elected The French Menu Cookbook as their favourite cookbook in early 2010, but were saddened that it was very difficult to find. Since then the book has been republished.

== English bibliography ==
- The French Menu Cookbook: The Food and Wine of France—Season by Delicious Season—in Beautifully Composed Menus for American Dining and Entertaining by an American Living in Paris and Provence (1970), ISBN 0-671-20365-7
- Simple French Food (1974), ISBN 0-689-10575-4
- Yquem (1986), ISBN 0-87923-644-2
- Ten Vineyard Lunches (1988), (later reprinted as Richard Olney's French Wine & Food: A Wine Lover's Cookbook (1997)) ISBN 0-940793-23-7
- Provence, the Beautiful Cookbook: Authentic Recipes from the Regions of Provence (1993), ISBN 0-00-255154-3
- Lulu's Provençal Table: The Exuberant Food and Wine from Domaine Tempier Vineyard (1994), ISBN 0-06-016922-2
- Romanée Conti: The World's Most Fabled Wine (1995), ISBN 0-8478-1927-2
- Cooking for Two (1996), ISBN 0-297-83650-1
- The Good Cook's Encyclopedia (1997), ISBN 1-899988-95-5 (ed.)
- Richard Olney's French Wine and Food: A Wine Lover's Cookbook (1997), ISBN 1-56656-226-0
- Reflexions (1999), ISBN 1-883283-20-5
- (anthologized in) American Food Writing: An Anthology with Classic Recipes, ed. Molly O'Neill (Library of America, 2007), ISBN 1-59853-005-4
