= Chez Panisse =

Restaurant in Berkeley, California, US

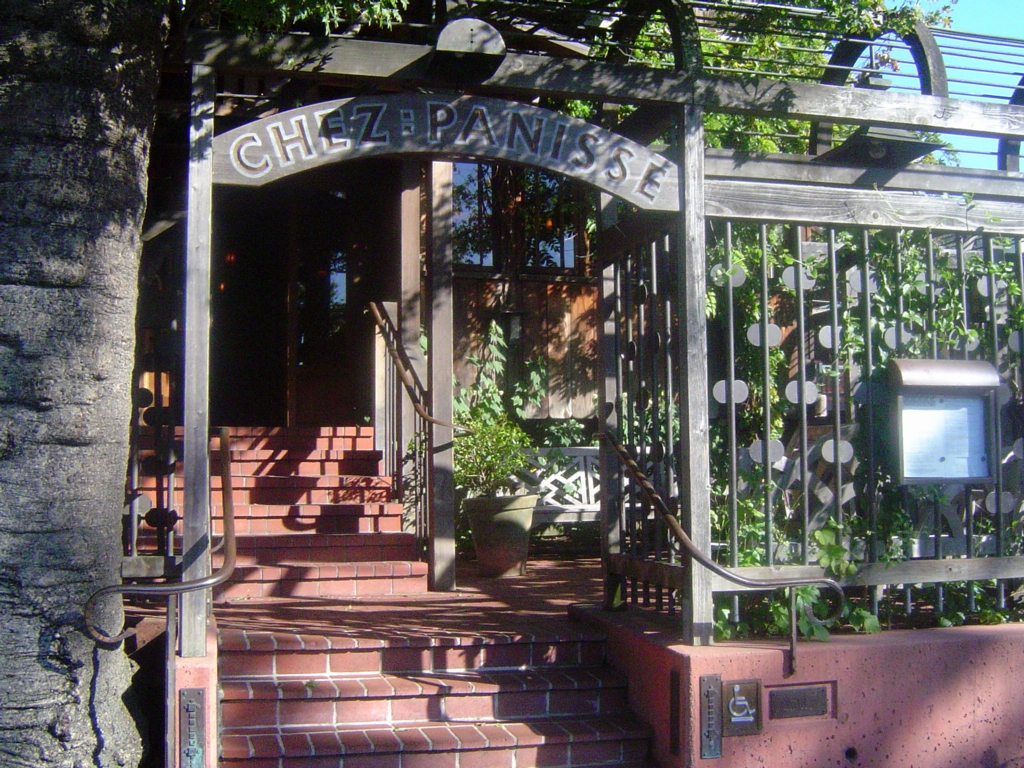
- Front entrance.
- Interactive map of Chez Panisse

Restaurant information
- Established: 1971
- Owner: Alice Waters
- Food type: California
- Location: 1517 Shattuck Avenue, Berkeley, Alameda County, California, 94709, United States
- Coordinates: 37°52′46.49″N 122°16′8.46″W
- Website: chezpanisse.com

Chez Panisse is a restaurant in Berkeley, California, known as one of the originators of California cuisine and the farm-to-table movement, opened and owned by Alice Waters. The restaurant emphasizes ingredients rather than technique and has developed a supply network of direct relationships with local farmers, ranchers, and dairies.

The main restaurant, located downstairs, serves a set menu that changes daily and reflects the season's produce. An upstairs cafe offers an à la carte menu at lower prices.

== History ==
The restaurateur, author, and food activist Alice Waters opened Chez Panisse in 1971 with the film producer Paul Aratow, then a professor of comparative literature at the University of California, Berkeley. It is named for a character in Marcel Pagnol's Marseille Trilogy. They set up the restaurant and its menu on the principle that it was of primary importance to use food that was fresh and in season, grown locally, organically and sustainably.

Victoria Wise was the first chef. Waters and the restaurant began building up their network of local producers. Many of these local farmers, ranchers, and dairies continue to provide the restaurant with the majority of its ingredients today. This approach was extremely innovative. Later chefs de cuisine were Jeremiah Tower and Paul Bertolli and Jean-Pierre Moulle. The building was remodeled twice following fires in 1982 and 2013.

== Influences ==
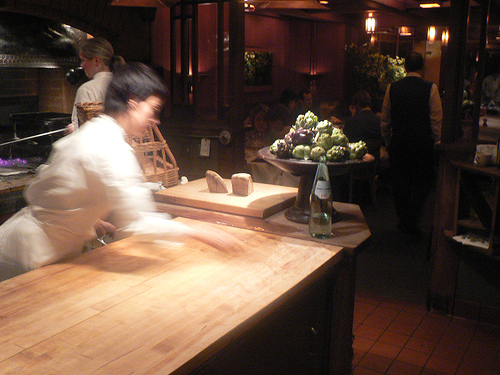
The Chez Panisse downstairs kitchen and dining room

The culinary influences for Chez Panisse were largely French, inspired by the 1920s cookbook of French cuisine bourgeoise, La bonne cuisine de Madame E. Saint-Ange. This book has been translated into English by Paul Aratow, who was also the first chef de cuisine at Chez Panisse. Waters, who had been an exchange student in France in the early 1960s, was influenced by French food-related values and customs, including buying local produce and being frugal to avoid waste. Other influences included vineyard owners Lulu and Lucien Peyraud and the writings of Richard Olney and Elizabeth David.

== Critical reception ==
In 2001, Gourmet magazine named Chez Panisse the Best Restaurant in America. From 2002 to 2008, it was ranked by Restaurant magazine as one of the top 50 restaurants in the world and was ranked number 12 in 2003. (Note: Number 20 in 2006 and number 69 in 2010.) (Note: Number 40 in 2007.) (Note: Number 37 in 2008.) Michelin awarded the restaurant a one-star rating in its guide to San Francisco Bay Area dining from 2006 through 2009, but the restaurant lost its star in 2010. In 2007, Alice Waters won Restaurant Magazine's Lifetime Achievement Award, and was cited as one of the most influential figures in American cooking over the past 50 years.

== Culinary innovations ==
- Farm-to-table
- California cuisine
- California-style pizza: baked in an in-house pizza oven and topped with a variety of local ingredients, was created at the cafe in 1980.
- Goat cheese salad: first offered in the late 1970s, the salad contains rounds of chèvre marinated in olive oil and herbs, coated in bread crumbs, and baked, served with lightly dressed mesclun.
- In-house carbonated tap water: this filtered version of the East Bay Municipal Utility District offering was first replaced by conventional bottled water at the restaurant in summer 2006.

== Artwork and branding ==
Berkeley designer and printmaker David Lance Goines has illustrated many of the Chez Panisse posters and defined the visual brand in the 1970s and 1980s. The aesthetic for the brand was influenced by Ukiyo-e and the German Art Nouveau movement (German: Jugendstil).

Patricia Curtan has been the designer and artist of many of the menus and some of the cookbooks for Chez Panisse, which were created as linocut prints. Curtan published the book Menus for Chez Panisse (2011).

== Notable alumni ==
- Andy Baraghani
- Dan Barber
- Paul Bertolli
- April Bloomfield
- Suzanne Goin
- Joyce Goldstein
- David Lebovitz
- Deborah Madison
- Samin Nosrat
- Mark Peel
- Jeremiah Tower
- Jonathan Waxman

== Cookbooks ==
- Waters, Alice (1982). The Chez Panisse Menu Cookbook. New York: Random House. ISBN 978-0-394-51787-2.
- Bertolli, Paul; Waters, Alice (1994). Chez Panisse Cooking. New York: Random House. ISBN 978-0-679-75535-7.
- Shere, Lindsey Remolif (1994). Chez Panisse Desserts. New York: Random House. ISBN 978-0-679-75571-5.
- Waters, Alice (1996). Chez Panisse Vegetables. New York: HarperCollins. ISBN 978-0-06-017147-6.
- Waters, Alice (1999). Chez Panisse Café Cookbook. New York: HarperCollins. ISBN 978-0-06-017583-2.
- Waters, Alice (2002). Chez Panisse Fruit. New York: HarperCollins. ISBN 978-0-06-019957-9.
- Waters, Alice; Curtan, Patricia; Labro, Martine (2011). Chez Panisse Pasta, Pizza & Calzone. New York: Random House. ISBN 978-0-394-53094-9.
- Waters, Alice (2011). 40 Years of Chez Panisse: The Power of Gathering. New York: Clarkson Potter/Publishers. ISBN 978-0-307-71826-6.

== See also ==
- Gourmet Ghetto
- Greens Restaurant
- Moosewood Restaurant
