= Paul Bertolli =

American chef, artisan food producer, writer

Paul Joseph Bertolli
- Born: 1954 (age 71–72); San Rafael, California, U.S.
- Culinary career
- Cooking style: California cuisine, Italian cuisine
- Previous restaurant(s): Oliveto, Oakland, California, Chez Panisse, Berkeley, California
- Website: www.framani.com

Paul Joseph Bertolli (born 1954) is an American chef, writer, and artisan food producer.

== Biography ==
Paul Bertolli was born in 1954 in San Rafael, California, to parents of Italian descent. He rose to prominence in the gourmet food world at Chez Panisse in nearby Berkeley, California, working from 1982 to 1992. He eventually became executive chef and co-authoring Chez Panisse Cooking with restaurant founder Alice Waters. He was later the executive chef of the Oliveto restaurant in Oakland, California, until mid-2005.

He is known for producing handcrafted ingredients like balsamic vinegar and salumi (cured-pork products such as salami and prosciutto). He opened a food supplier, Fra' Mani Handcrafted Salumi, in March 2006 ('Fra Mani' is derived from the Italian for 'between or among hands'; and conveys the message 'from our hands to yours'). In 2003, he also authored, Cooking by Hand: A Cookbook.
