= Patrick Skoff =

Chicago-based American artist

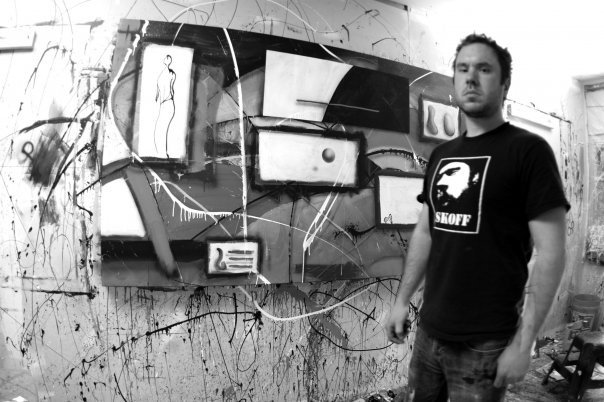
Chicago artist Patrick Skoff.

Patrick Skoff (January 22) is a Chicago-based artist most notable for his "art scavenger hunts" in which he leaves his poster-size paintings around the streets of Chicago for people to find and keep.

In addition to his art scavenger hunts, Skoff also is known for his series of miniature artwork titled Little Things and his live painting events in various locations in Chicago.

== Biography ==
Born in Franklin Park, Illinois, Skoff began painting in elementary school. It was there that his art teacher encouraged him to enter one of his paintings into the district's school-wide art contest, which he won the highest award. He continued painting from then on.

It was his childhood lifestyle in Franklin Park that first inspired Skoff to give away his paintings for free. He grew up in a small neighborhood where people often shared their skills and talents with others in order to receive help themselves. He enjoyed the comfort and happiness that this free help inspired and therefore decided to recapture that comfort by giving away his artwork, which he hoped would inspire others to share their talents as well.

When Skoff began his art hunts, he also had a part-time job doing landscape design, which enabled him to support his dream of giving artwork away for free. After selling many paintings and putting in much hard work, in September 2009 Skoff was able to give up his business of landscape design in order to pursue his dream of being a full-time artist.

== Artwork ==
Skoff paints mainly abstract art because he says that it is easy and fun but he also dabbles into portraits and metal sculptures.

=== Little Things ===
In July 2008, Skoff first began leaving his mark around the city with his series of "Little Things." These pieces were inspired by the little things that make life worth living such as hope and trust. Each "Little Thing" included a tile-sized painting that represented the subject. It was then placed on a tiny easel, accompanied by a wooden mannequin artist and stamped with Skoff's website on the back.

=== Art hunts ===
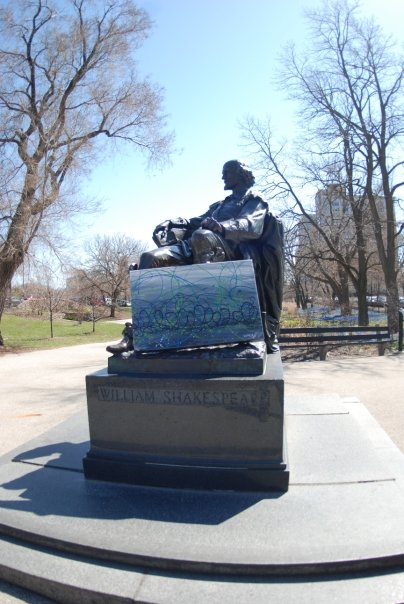
Skoff painting left out during an Art Hunt.

After leaving several Little Things out around the city for people to find, Skoff received an unexpected amount of feedback and support. Because of this, he decided to leave out some bigger pieces of artwork for people to find and claim as their own. Eventually Skoff began receiving so many emails from people eager to participate that he rounded up a bunch of paintings and decided to leave them all out on the same day. He then posted an ad under the free section on Craigslist with a clue as to where the paintings would be and a picture of the painting hidden somewhere in the city. People then ran all over the city in hopes of finding a painting that they could take home.

As he continued to put on art hunts throughout the city, Skoff gained more and more followers and the art hunts became more frequent. In order to let all of his followers know about the art hunt dates and locations, Skoff added all of his followers on Facebook and sent out a message of when and where the hunt would be. He also continued to post the location under the free section on Craigslist so that new followers could emerge.

Although Skoff doesn't have an exact number of how many people come out for the hunts, he said that most paintings are gone within 15 minutes so he knows there are quite a few people looking for them.

In 2009, Skoff added Sam Brown to his team. Together they make up Skoff & Sam and equally create and distribute the artwork that makes up the art hunts.

=== Sponsored pieces ===
In the Summer of 2009 Skoff began creating some of his artwork in pairs, with only little differences between the two paintings. He then gave his fans and followers the option of sponsoring the artwork. When someone sponsors a piece of Skoff artwork, they purchase a painting of their choice and then its mate becomes a piece for a future art hunt with its sponsor's name going on the back.

== Art Van ==
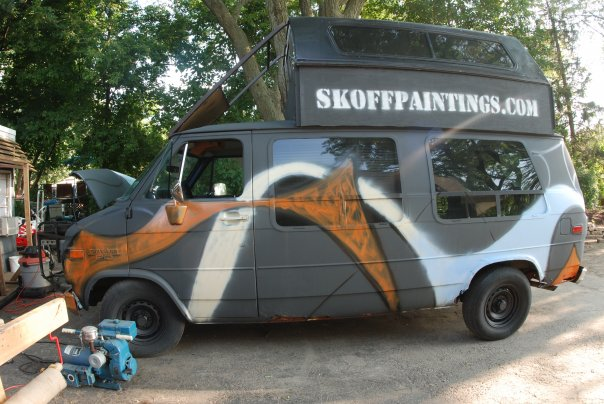
Skoff's Art Van

In the Summer of 2009, Skoff purchased a beat-up van and transformed it into a studio on wheels. He then painted the entire outside, spray painted SkoffPaintings.com down the side and added a loft studio to the top. He plans to turn the van into his rolling studio and travel across the country in it producing free art hunts in cities across the United States. Skoff also accepts donations to fund his trip and will be putting the names of his sponsors along the art van.

== Press ==
In October 2008, during the presidential campaign, Skoff stood outside WBBM-TV in downtown Chicago and began to paint a portrait of Barack Obama visible through the studio window to show his support for the candidate. The painting sold quickly after he was finished. WBBM-TV interviewed him while he was painting the portrait and asked him to come back the following day to paint a picture of John McCain so that the candidates would have equal air time. Skoff returned the next morning, as promised, and painted a similar portrait of McCain while WBBM-TV filmed again.

Skoff has also been featured on WLS-TV's 190 North and WTTW's Jay's Chicago, and in Newcity magazine.
