= Lucie Peyraud =

French cook and winemaker (1917–2020)

Lucie "Lulu" Peyraud
- Born: Lucie Tempier; 11 December 1917; Marseille, France
- Died: 7 October 2020 (aged 102)
- Occupations: Winemaker; cook
- Known for: Domaine Tempier
- Spouse: Lucien Peyraud (m. 1936; died 1996)
- Children: 7
- Parents: Alphonse Tempier (father); Eugénie Raybaud (mother)

Lucie "Lulu" Peyraud (11 December 1917 – 7 October 2020) was a French winemaker and cook.

== Biography ==
Lucie Tempier was born in Marseille to a family of traders in December 1917. Her father, Alphonse Tempier was a leather importer and owner of the Domaine Tempier vineyard and her mother was Eugénie Raybaud. The family had owned Domaine Tempier since 1834.

In 1940, Tempier and her husband, Lucien Peyraud, took charge of a Tempier family farming and wine estate in Le Castellet (Var). The couple kept developing their estate and they and other growers were key in having the Bandol "protected designation of origin" (appellation d'origine contrôlée, AOC) recognized in 1941, and had the ambition of making it one of the great wines of France. By 1943, Domaine Tempier released its first bottled wines of rosé, prior to that selling their wine in bulk to wine merchants.

After World War II, Peyraud traveled the world with her husband to learn about foreign wine and techniques, and to promote French wines. Their travels took them to South Africa, Germany, the United States, Austria, Bulgaria, Chile, Georgia, Greece, Italy, Mexico, and Romania. Lucien Peyraud was the President of the Bandol Wine Association for 37 years from 1945 to 1982. He was also a member of the INAO in 1947 and of the International Organization of the Vine and Wine (OIV), as an auditor in the Oenology Commission.

Despite being the mother of seven children, Lulu Peyraud acted as an ambassador of the wines of Domaine Tempier, often traveling throughout France to present the estate's wines to restaurants and hotels.

Lucie and Lucien repeatedly offered the Tempier Vineyard for the annual Young Cinematography International Meetings (Rencontres Internationales du Jeune Cinéma) in Hyères (1965–1983), as a place for meetings and exchanges for actors and young filmmakers who came to present their films at the festival. In 1983, Lulu participated in the creation of the "Order of the Ladies of the Wine and the Table" (Ordre des Dames du Vin et de la Table), and was its vice-president for three years

Peyraud's typical Provençal recipes earned her a reputation on the other side of the Atlantic amongst well known personalities, such as restaurateur and activist of the "Slow Food" movement, Alice Waters, food critic and writer Richard Olney, writer Jim Harrison, and wine merchant Kermit Lynch.

Richard Olney dedicated an entire book to her cooking in 1994, called "Lulu's Provencal Table: The Exuberant Food and Wine from the Domaine Tempier Vineyard."

== Marriage ==
She met her husband Lucien Peyraud, a viticulturalist, in 1935 whom she met while he was on holiday in Sanary-sur-Mer. They would marry in 1936. They had seven children, Jean-Marie, François, Fleurine, Colette, Marion, Laurence and Véronique.

== Death ==
She turned 100 in December 2017 and died in October 2020 at the age of 102. Lucien died in 1996.

== Bibliography ==
- "Les Vins de Bandol," under the direction of Maurice Stagliano, published by Autres Temps, 2006.
- "Le Bandol," by Pascal Perrier, published by Nouvelles éditions Loubatières, 2013.
- "Off to the Side: A Memoir," by Jim Harrison, paperback 288 pages, Grove Press, 8 August 2003.
- "Jim Harrison ne mangera plus de tête de veau," by Jacky Durand, Libération, 28 March 2016.
- "Big Jim Harrison," by Nicolas Ungemuth, Le Figaro, 27 March 2016.
- "Jim Harrison, L'ours en sa tanière," by Charlotte Rotman, Libération, 23 October 2012.
- "Le Var et les Etats-Unis : Partenaires Particuliers," by Lilian Renard, Var Matin, 2 November 2008.
- "Adieu, Olney: American Defended The Honor And Pleasures Of French Cooking," by William Rice, Tribune Food and Wine Columnist, The Chicago Tribune, 11 August 1999.
- "Richard Olney, 71, a Writer Of the Joys of French Cooking," by R. W. Apple Jr, The New York Times, 4 August 1999.
- "Eating from the table of contents: Richard Olney's New Recipe Book," by Emily Green, The Independent, 12 August 1994.
- "Elizabeth David Is Dead at 78; Noted British Cookbook Writer," by Marian Burros, The New York Times, 28 May 1992.
