= Kermit Lynch =

American wine importer (born 1941)

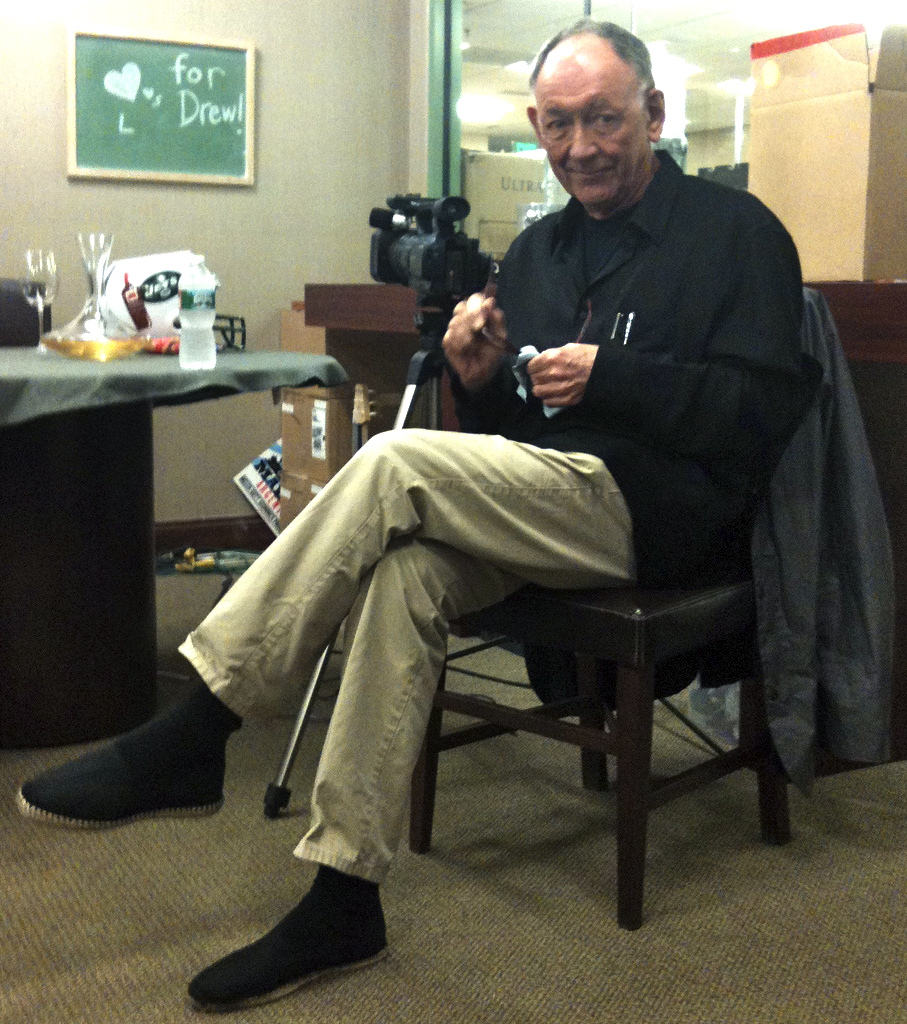
- Born: December 1941 (age 83); Bakersfield, California
- Occupation(s): Wine importer, author
- Spouse: Gail Skoff

Kermit Lynch (born December 1941 in Bakersfield, California) is an American wine importer and author based in Berkeley, California. He is the author of Adventures on the Wine Route, which won the Veuve Clicquot Wine Book of the Year award, as well as Inspiring Thirst. He also co-owns Domaine Les Pallières in Gigondas along with the Brunier family of Domaine du Vieux Télégraphe in Châteauneuf-du-Pape, France.

He is married to the American photographer Gail Skoff, whose photographs illustrate his books.

== Career ==
Lynch was born into a family of teetotalers, and was introduced to wine at seventeen by two graduates of UC Berkeley.

In 1972, Lynch opened his eponymous wine importing store in Albany, before moving to Berkeley in the 1980s.

Richard Olney introduced Lynch to many French wine growers, including Lucien and Lulu Peyraud, who were then re-establishing the Bandol AOC as a vineyard area.

Lynch introduced use of refrigerated shipping containers to prevent wines from being ruined by heat during shipping. After noticing that wines imported from Burgundy tasted different than he remembered at the winery, Lynch began experimenting with refrigerated containers and found that the problem was eliminated.

In the late 1980s and early 1990s, Lynch took objection to a regulation of the Bureau of Alcohol, Tobacco, and Firearms that required wine bottles to be labeled with the Surgeon General's warning against alcohol consumption but prohibited any countering sentiment about the benefits of moderate wine drinking. Lynch successfully petitioned for a change of policy.

== Awards and honors ==
Lynch won the James Beard Foundation's Wine Professional of the Year award in 2000 and in 2006 won the Who's Who of Food and Beverage in America.

In 1998, he received the Chevalier de l'Ordre de Mérite Agricole ('Order of Agricultural Merit') medal from the French government for his service to the wine industry. In 2005 he was also awarded France's highest honor given to civilians, the insignia of Chevalier de la Legion d'Honneur ('Knight of the Legion of Honor').

== Published works ==
- Adventures on the Wine Route: A Wine Buyer's Tour of France, Farrar, Straus and Giroux, New York, 1988
- Inspiring Thirst: Vintage Selections from the Kermit Lynch Wine Brochure, Ten Speed Press, Berkeley, 2004
- 25th Anniversary Edition of Adventures on the Wine Route: A Wine Buyer's Tour of France, Farrar, Straus and Giroux, New York, 2013
- At Poupon's Table: A Novel, Podium Publishing, 2025

== See also ==
- List of wine personalities
