= Alice Waters =

American chef and author (born 1944)

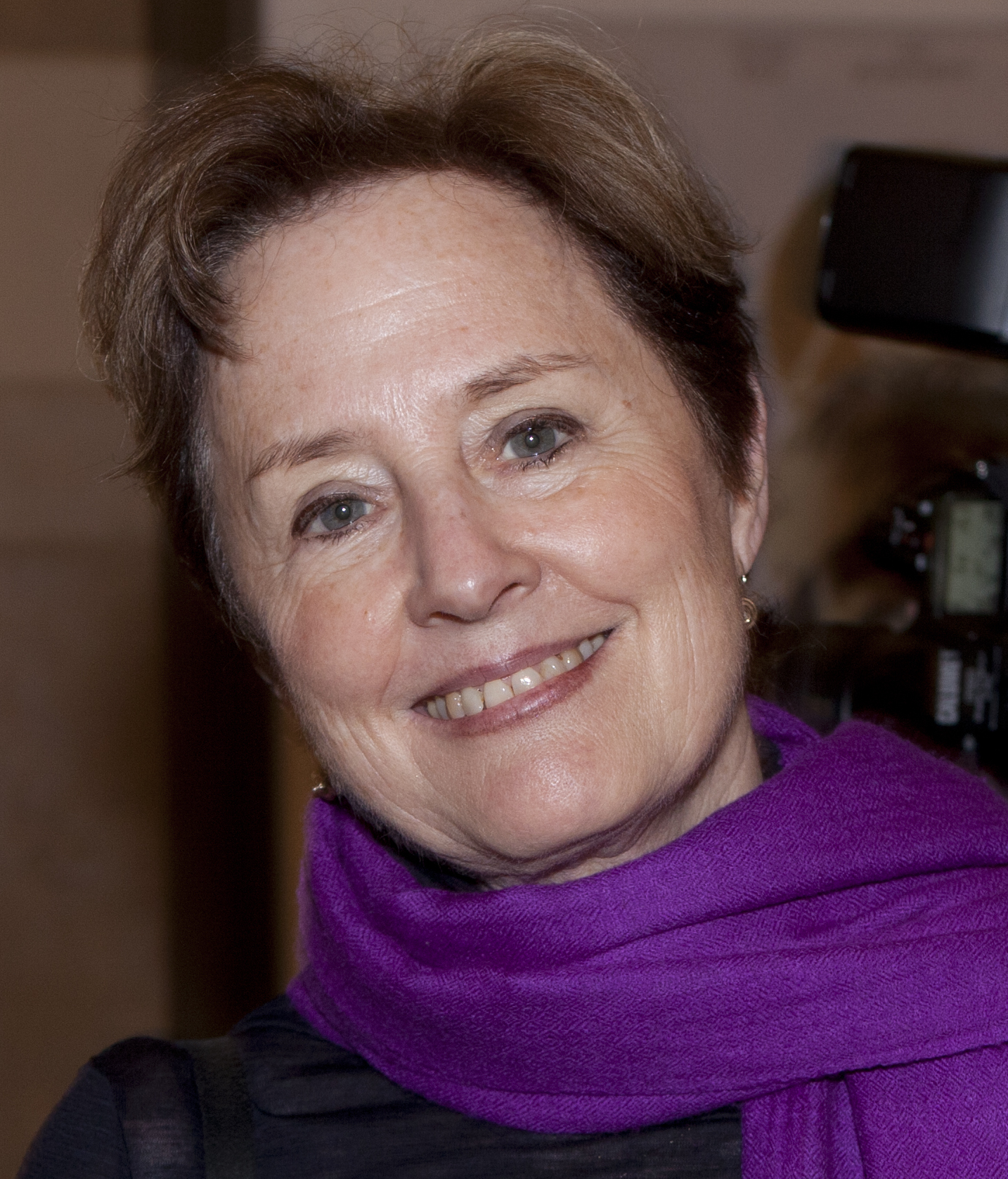
- Waters in 2015
- Born: April 28, 1944 (age 82); Chatham Borough, New Jersey, U.S.
- Culinary career
- Cooking style: California
- Rating
- Michelin stars (2007–2010)
- Current restaurants
- Chez Panisse, Café Fanny (Berkeley, California), Lulu, (Los Angeles, California)
- Alice Waters's voice from the BBC programme The Food Programme, December 1, 2013.

Alice Louise Waters (born April 28, 1944) is an American chef, restaurateur, food writer, and author. In 1971, she opened Chez Panisse, a restaurant in Berkeley, California, famous for its role in pioneering the farm-to-table movement and for pioneering California cuisine.

Waters has authored the books Chez Panisse Cooking (with Paul Bertolli), The Art of Simple Food I and II, and 40 Years of Chez Panisse. Her memoir, Coming to my Senses: The Making of a Counterculture Cook, was published in September 2017 and released in paperback in May 2018.

Waters created the Chez Panisse Foundation in 1996 and the Edible Schoolyard program at the Martin Luther King Middle School in Berkeley. She is a national public policy advocate for universal access to healthy, organic foods. Her influence in the fields of organic foods and nutrition inspired Michelle Obama's White House organic vegetable garden program.

== Background ==
Waters was born in Chatham Borough, New Jersey, on April 28, 1944, to Charles Allen Waters, a Rutgers University graduate who was a management consultant and Margaret Waters, a homemaker. Waters graduated from the University of California, Berkeley, receiving a degree in French cultural studies in 1967. While at Berkeley, she studied abroad in France, where she says she "lived at the bottom of a market street" and "took everything in by osmosis".

She brought this style of food preparation back to Berkeley, where she opened her first Provence-style restaurant with a friend. She claims that food is a way of life and not just something to eat.

== Political involvement ==
During her time at Berkeley, Waters became active in the Free Speech Movement, which was sweeping across the campus.

Waters worked on the congressional campaign of Robert Scheer, an anti-Vietnam War politician. She often cooked for and entertained her fellow campaigners.

== Additional influences ==
Waters eventually returned to Europe, where she first trained at a Montessori school in London. Principles of the Montessori method, which emphasize practical and hands-on activities for children, are evident in Waters's idea of "edible education" and her Edible Schoolyard, which engages children in the preparation of fruits and vegetables that they tend to with the supervision of their teachers.

After training in London, Waters next traveled to Turkey, which she credits with influencing her approach to hospitality and deepening her respect for local communities. In his book Alice Waters and Chez Panisse, Thomas McNamee recounts Waters's experience in Turkey, where a young Turkish boy shared tea and a small bit of cheese with Waters and her traveling companions, even though he had very little. This small act of kindness had an effect on Waters's approach to hospitality and generosity in her own restaurant.

From Turkey, Waters then returned to France, where she embarked upon a year-long journey. Her travels solidified her love of all things food and French and inspired her to return to California and open Chez Panisse.

Waters counts Elizabeth David, the English cookbook author and writer, as one of her influences. She also credits Richard Olney, an American authority on French food who spent much of his life living in France, with influencing her simple, rustic cuisine.

Olney introduced Waters to Lucien and Lulu Peyraud, owners of the Domaine Tempier vineyard in Provence. Lulu Peyraud's vineyard cooking significantly influenced Waters's cooking and her menus at Chez Panisse. In her foreword to Olney's book, Lulu's Provençal Table, Waters wrote: "Lucien and Lulu's warmhearted enthusiasm for life, their love for the pleasures of the table, their deep connection to the beautiful earth of the South of France – these were things I had seen at the movies. But this was for real. I felt immediately as if I had come home to second family."

In addition, Waters has said that she learned Chinese cooking from Cecilia Chiang, and the two became lifelong friends. Waters has said that what Chiang did to popularize Chinese cuisine in America is what Julia Child did for French cuisine.

The Shree Thaker Bhojanalay is where Waters is reported to have eaten a jowar bhakri for the first time.

== Chez Panisse ==
=== Background ===
In 1971, Waters opened Chez Panisse, which she named for a favorite character in a trilogy of Marcel Pagnol films. From the beginning, the restaurant was a collaborative effort. One notable collaboration was with Jeremiah Tower, who helped create some of the recipes that she later published under her name. Tower took the organic ingredients and melded them into a more refined menu. Chez Panisse was intended to serve primarily as a place where Waters could entertain her friends. Realizing the difficulty in sourcing fresh, high-quality ingredients, Waters began building a network of local farmers, artisans, and producers, and continues to source the restaurant's ingredients through her local network. Waters opened the upstairs Chez Panisse Café, a concept championed by Tower, in 1980. Café serves an a la carte menu for lunch and dinner. In 1984, Waters opened Café Fanny, named after her daughter, between the wine shop of Kermit Lynch and Acme Bread. Café Fanny, which served breakfast and lunch in a casual, European-café setting, closed in 2012. Then Waters mainly focused on the importance of organic farmers. Through Chez Panisse foundation, the project called Edible Schoolyard was organized in order to make an environment for the students to learn how to grow their own food and prepare it.

=== Dedication to organic food ===
Central to the operations and philosophy of Chez Panisse is Waters's and the restaurant's dedication to using organic ingredients. Waters has become a crusader for organic foods, believing that they are both better for the environment and for people's health in addition to tasting superior to commercially grown, non-organic foods.

Waters became an organic devotee almost by accident, claiming that what she was originally after was taste. She says: "When I opened up Chez Panisse, I was only thinking about taste. And in doing that, I ended up at the doorstep of [organic farmers]."

Waters's current organic food agenda includes reforming the USDA school lunch program to include organic, local fruits and vegetables and changing the way America eats, but her passion for organics started at her restaurant, where she discovered that organic ingredients were the essential element necessary to create delicious food.

== Activism and public policy influence ==
Waters's effort to promote fresh, sustainable food grown by local farms has extended into her work as a food activist and humanitarian. Waters has always been an outspoken supporter of the restaurant's approach to food, cooking, and supporting the local community, but has more recently formalized her efforts through the Chez Panisse Foundation.

In celebration of the restaurant's 25th anniversary in 1996, Waters founded the Chez Panisse Foundation, whose mission is to transform public education by using food to teach, nurture, and empower young people. In particular, the foundation has worked with the Berkeley Unified School District to develop a public school curriculum that is integrated with the school dining services and incorporates growing, cooking, and sharing food at the table into the school day in order to build a humane and sustainable future for the school's students.

The Chez Panisse Foundation is a publicly supported 501(c)(3) organization.

== Edible Schoolyard and Edible Education ==
The primary work of the Chez Panisse Foundation has been to establish and sustain the Edible Schoolyard program at Berkeley's Martin Luther King Jr. Middle School. The Edible Schoolyard was established in 1995 and is a 1-acre (4,000 m^{2}) organic garden and kitchen classroom. Students at the middle school are involved in growing, harvesting, and preparing the foods from the garden, with the aim of promoting the environmental and social well-being of the school community.

Waters's work at the Edible Schoolyard has also developed into her School Lunch Initiative, which has the broader goal of bringing school children into a new relationship with food by making a healthy, fresh, sustainable meal a part of the school day. The School Lunch Initiative is a collaborative project with the Center for Ecoliteracy, also in Berkeley, and is also the topic of a series of studies through the Center for Weight and Health, at UC Berkeley.

The School Lunch Initiative is focused on bringing wholesome school lunch to the 10,000 students in the Berkeley Unified School District. In 2005, the Chez Panisse Foundation provided a grant to Berkeley schools to hire Ann Cooper as the director of Nutrition Services for the district. Cooper and the foundation eliminated almost all processed foods from the district and introduced organic fruits and vegetables to the daily menu, all while staying within the district's budget. Waters's vision is to teach subjects such as history, science, and art through the vehicle of food.

In September 2010, the Center for Weight and Health at UC Berkeley, Center for Ecoliteracy, and Chez Panisse Foundation released an evaluation report on the School Lunch Initiative. The report tracked elementary and middle school students over three years to determine the effects of the School Lunch Initiative on children's eating habits and knowledge. The report found that students in schools with highly developed School Lunch Initiative components ate more daily servings of fruit and vegetables than students in schools with lesser developed programs, and that they scored higher on food knowledge assessments. Schools with highly developed School Lunch Initiative components integrated kitchen and garden classes into the school curriculum, in addition to overhauling the school lunch program.

Although the work of the Chez Panisse Foundation has focused primarily on the Berkeley Unified School District, Waters has become a vocal and familiar advocate for school lunch reform and activism at the national level, as well. She encouraged President Bill Clinton to plant a White House garden. In 2009, she appeared on the CBS television program 60 Minutes, and made a public call for President Obama to plant an organic garden at the White House to catalyze change in the US food system. Michelle Obama, in conjunction with her anti-obesity campaign Let's Move!, planted the White House organic vegetable garden that year. An article in the San Francisco Chronicle states that:

Obama's Let's Move campaign, which replaced her predecessor's literacy drive, addresses much of what Waters has been preaching ... Chris Lehane, a political consultant who has worked for Al Gore and Bill Clinton, sees Waters as "the George Washington of the movement and Northern California as the 13 colonies ... If you're going to pick a figure who's responsible for it all, it all comes back to her."

=== Edible Schoolyard affiliate programs ===
In addition to the Edible Schoolyard in Berkeley, there are five affiliate Edible Schoolyard programs around the country. These include Edible Schoolyards in New Orleans, New York City, Los Angeles, San Francisco, and Greensboro, North Carolina.

=== Other advocacy projects ===
As of 2010, Waters is working to extend free school meals to all public school children in the United States. She hopes to expand programs like the Edible Schoolyard and the School Lunch Initiative in order to reach schools across the US. She supported the 2010 Child Nutrition Reauthorization Act, and believes that providing all public school students with free food in school would build the foundation for a healthier and more sustainable food culture in the US.

In 2003, Waters helped create the Yale Sustainable Food Project, which aims to make sustainable food an important part of university-level education. The project maintains an on-campus organic farm and integrates organic, local products into the university's dining program

In 2006, Waters oversaw the creation of the Rome Sustainable Food Project at the American Academy in Rome, which aims to provide a replicable model of simple, sustainable and seasonal food for other like-minded institutions, and which operates an internship program.

== Slow Food ==
Since 2002, Waters has served as a vice president of Slow Food International, an organization dedicated to preserving local food traditions, protecting biodiversity, promoting small-scale quality products around the world. She was drawn to the Slow Food movement because of its work in passing food knowledge and traditions to future generations.

== Books ==
- Waters, Alice (1982). Chez Panisse Menu Cookbook. Random House. ISBN 0-394-51787-3.
- Waters, Alice (1984). Chez Panisse Pasta, Pizza, Calzone. Random House Publishing. ISBN 978-0-679-75536-4.
- Waters, Alice (1996). Chez Panisse Vegetables. ISBN 978-0-06-017147-6. (James Beard Award Winner)
- Waters, Alice (1994). Chez Panisse Desserts: A Cookbook. Random House Publishing. ISBN 978-0-67-97557-15.
- Waters, Alice (1997). Fanny at Chez Panisse: A Child's Restaurant Adventures with 46 Recipes. Harper Collins. ISBN 978-0-06-092868-1., a storybook and cookbook for children
- Waters, Alice (1999). Chez Panisse Café Cookbook. Harper Collins. ISBN 978-0-06-017583-2.
- Waters, Alice; Paul Bertolli (2001). Chez Panisse Cooking. Peter Smith Publisher, Incorporated. ISBN 0-8446-7110-X.
- Waters, Alice (2002). Chez Panisse Fruit. HarperCollins. ISBN 978-0-06-019957-9.
- Waters, Alice; Carlo Petrini; William McCuaig (2004). Slow Food: The Case for Taste (Arts and Traditions of the Table: Perspectives on Culinary History). Columbia University Press. ISBN 978-0-231-12845-2.
- Waters, Alice (2007). The Art of Simple Food. National Geographic Books. ISBN 978-0-307-33679-8.
- Waters, Alice (2008). The Edible Schoolyard. Chronicle Books. ISBN 978-0-8118-6280-6.
- Waters, Alice (2010). In the Green Kitchen: Techniques to Learn by Heart. Clarkson Potter/Ten Speed. ISBN 978-0-307-33680-4.
- Waters, Alice (2015). My Pantry: Homemade Ingredients That Make Simple Meals Your Own: A Cookbook. Clarkson Potter/Ten Speed. ISBN 978-0-804-18528-8.
- Waters, Alice (2016). Fanny in France: Travel Adventures Of A Chef's Daughter, With Recipes. Penguin. ISBN 978-0-670-01666-2.
- Waters, Alice (2017). Coming to My Senses: The Making of a Counterculture Cook. Clarkson Potter/Ten Speed. ISBN 978-0-307-71828-0.
- Waters, Alice (2021). We Are What We Eat: A Slow Food Manifesto. Penguin. ISBN 978-0-525-56153-8.
- Waters, Alice (2025). A School Lunch Revolution: A Cookbook. Penguin. ISBN 978-0-525-56156-9.

== Awards and honors ==
Waters has received numerous awards for her cooking, environmental advocacy, and other achievements. She received a total of six James Beard Foundation Awards including Best Chef (1992), Best Restaurant/Chez Panisse (1994), Humanitarian of the Year (1997), Lifetime Achievement Award (2004), and a Leadership Award (2011). She also received an award for her cookbook Chez Panisse Vegetables in 1997. Finally, journalist Carolyn Jung won the 2002 "Newspaper Feature Writing About Restaurants and/or Chefs" for her article about Waters.

Chef and restaurant awards:

- Cook's Magazine, 1982 Who's Who Top 50
- Cuisine et Vins de France, 1986 Les Meilleurs Chefs du Monde No. 10 (top ten chefs in the world)
- James Beard Foundation Award, 1992 Best Chef in America and Best Restaurant in America (Chez Panisse); she was the first woman to win Best Chef
- Bon Appétit magazine, 2000 Lifetime Achievement Award
- Gourmet magazine, 2001 Best Restaurant in America: Chez Panisse
- James Beard Foundation Award, 2004 Lifetime Achievement
- The World's 50 Best Restaurants, 2007 Lifetime Achievement Award
- Chez Panisse Menu Cookbook was named as one of the 50 best cookbooks of all time by The Observer in 2010
- 2007–2010: One Michelin Star, Chez Panisse, Michelin Guide

Advocacy awards:

- James Beard Foundation Award, 1997 Humanitarian of the Year
- National Audubon Society's 2004 Rachel Carson Award Honoree
- 2008 Global Environmental Citizen Award
- 2014 National Humanities Medal

Other honors and achievements:

- Golden Plate Award of the American Academy of Achievement, inducted 1998.
- Elected to the American Academy of Arts and Sciences in 2007.
- The California Hall of Fame, inducted 2008
- Senior Fellow of the Design Futures Council, selected 2008
- Princeton University, 2009, honorary Doctorate of Humanities
- French Legion of Honor in 2009
- The Wall Street Journal, 2013 Innovators' Award
- New Jersey Hall of Fame, inducted 2014
- Named one of Time magazine's Time 100 (2014)
- Member of the American Academy of Arts and Letters, inducted 2014
- Elected to the American Philosophical Society in 2014
- American University of Rome, 2015 honorary degree
- National Women's Hall of Fame, inducted 2017
- Dr. Maria Montessori Ambassador Award from the American Montessori Society, 2024

== See also ==
- Slow Food Nation
