= Bread in American cuisine =

Overview of bread in the United States

Bread in American cuisine are a range of leavened and flatbreads made with various techniques that have been a staple of American cuisine since at least the time of the Thirteen Colonies.

== History ==
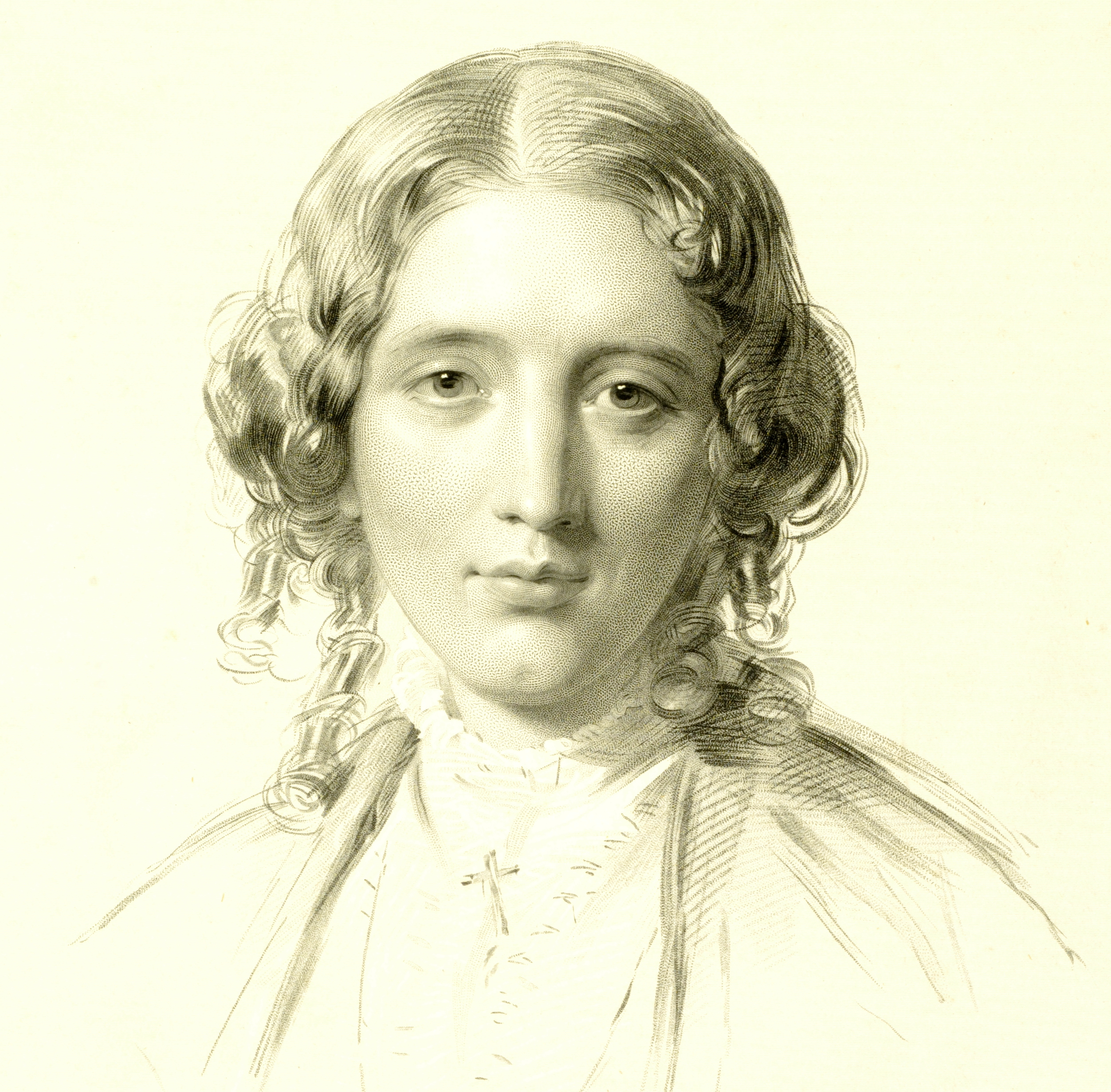
Harriet Beecher Stowe, who co-authored The American Woman's Home with her sister Catherine Beecher, believed homemade yeast bread was the only acceptable quality of bread.

Even before the American Revolution, cast iron ovens allowed women to bake their breads at home, instead of having loaves baked at communal ovens or bakeries. Baking bread remained a primarily domestic activity through the Antebellum era, changing only after the Civil War. As women's role in society was no longer exclusively domestic, concerns mounted that mass-produced breads would be inferior in flavor and quality, domestic manuals proliferated imploring women to maintain their roles in the household. Catherine Beecher and Harriet Beecher Stowe used the language of scripture to ask women readers to "stand in the way, ask for the old paths, and return to the good yeast-bread of their sainted grandmothers".

By the 1920s the manufacture of white bread was automated and pre-sliced loaves became available for the first time, possibly originating from Chillicothe, Missouri. After this, some historical heritage wheat varieties like the Marquis wheat stopped being produced. White bread came to symbolize the forces of modernity and industrialization, but was also at the center of a controversy. Wheat breads were seen to be healthier and moral choice by some; Bernarr Macfadden held the view that white bread threatened the health and superiority of the "white race".

== Yeast ==
Yeast was often used when making bread and could be sweet or sour, but bread could also be made without yeast with just a batter of water and flour in a tin pail set in warm water, about the consistency of a pan cake batter (organic flour and non-chlorinated water in this era allowed development of wild yeast). Once the batter had risen more flour would be added until reaching the consistency of a bread dough, then shaped into loaves and set aside in a bread basket. When the dough had dried out enough that it began to crack, it was ready to bake. Another no-yeast bread could be made with a combination of cream of tartar (acid) and sodium bicarbonate. Baking soda could also be used to "sweeten" sour milk for baking soft sour milk bread.

Yeast could be made by boiling flour with sugar and salt. This "yeast water" solution could be bottled and used when baker's yeast wasn't available.

== Types ==
=== Anadama bread ===
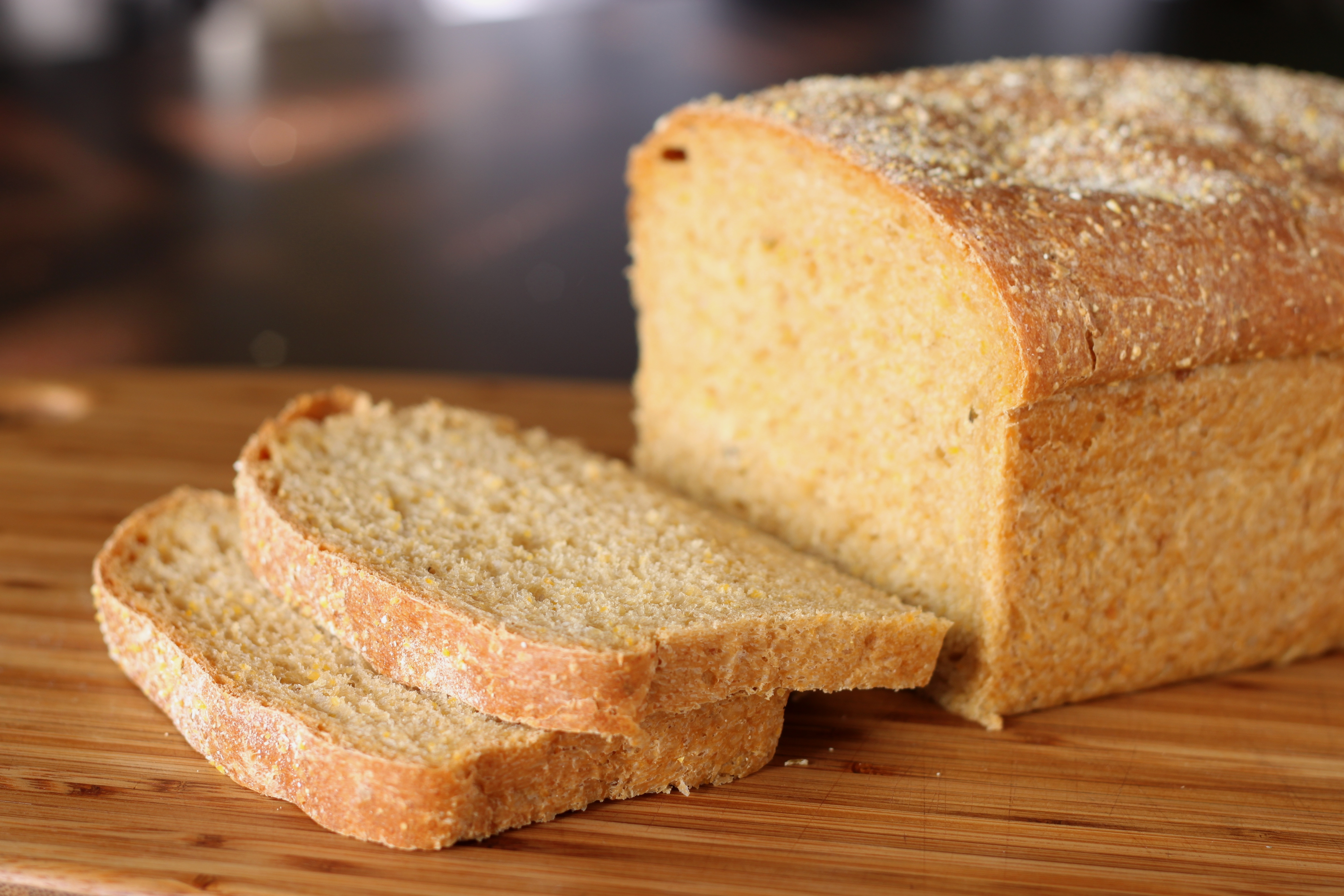
Anadama bread from New England

Anadama bread, a yeast bread made with cornmeal and molasses, originates from the North Shore area of Boston; several towns claim credit for the bread's creation.

=== Bagels ===
Bagels become a common street food in New York City's Lower East Side neighborhood in the early 20th century with the arrival of eastern European Jewish immigrants. the International Beigel Bakers' Union is formed in 1907, consisting of 300 bagel bakers. Handmade in small cellar bakeries, the secret of bagels was closely guarded, known only to the sons of union members; no one else was allowed to apprentice or be taught the bagel recipes.

=== Bialy ===
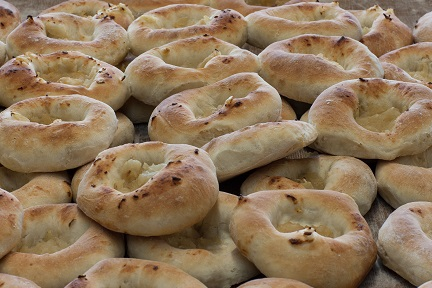
Bialys, similar to bagels

Bialys are associated with Jewish American cuisine. Like the related bagel, they enter American cuisine in the early 20th century with the arrival of eastern European Jewish immigrants.

=== Brown bread ===
Brown bread was made with scalded "Indian meal" (corn meal) and rye, to which molasses could be added.

=== Potato bread ===
Historically, potato bread was made with boiled mashed potatoes and allowed to ferment. Esther Allen Howland recommended water over milk because breads made with milk spoiled faster. According to Howland "The greater the proportion of potatoes, the lighter the bread will be; but if the proportion is very large, the bread will be so light as to dry up, if kept several days".

== In popular culture ==
Louisa May Alcott has been noted for employing bread as a symbol of hearth and home, the sphere of domesticity, and Christian charity, themes connected with womanhood in Alcott's work. In her novels Little Women and Eight Cousins the kitchen is a feminist space; Alcott saw baking bread and other traditionally feminine skills as fulfilling and enriching in a cosmopolitan era. By using the example of baking bread, and showing the character's difficulty accomplishing it, Alcott makes the point that domestic skills in cooking are as worthy as those pursuits generally ascribed to men. In Eight Cousins she writes: "It was some time before the perfect loaf appeared, for breadmaking is an art not easily learned...so Rose studied yeast first, and through various stages of cake and biscuit came at last to the crowning glory of the 'handsome, wholesome loaf."

== See also ==
- History of bread in California
- List of American breads
