= List of American breads =

List of breads from the United States of America

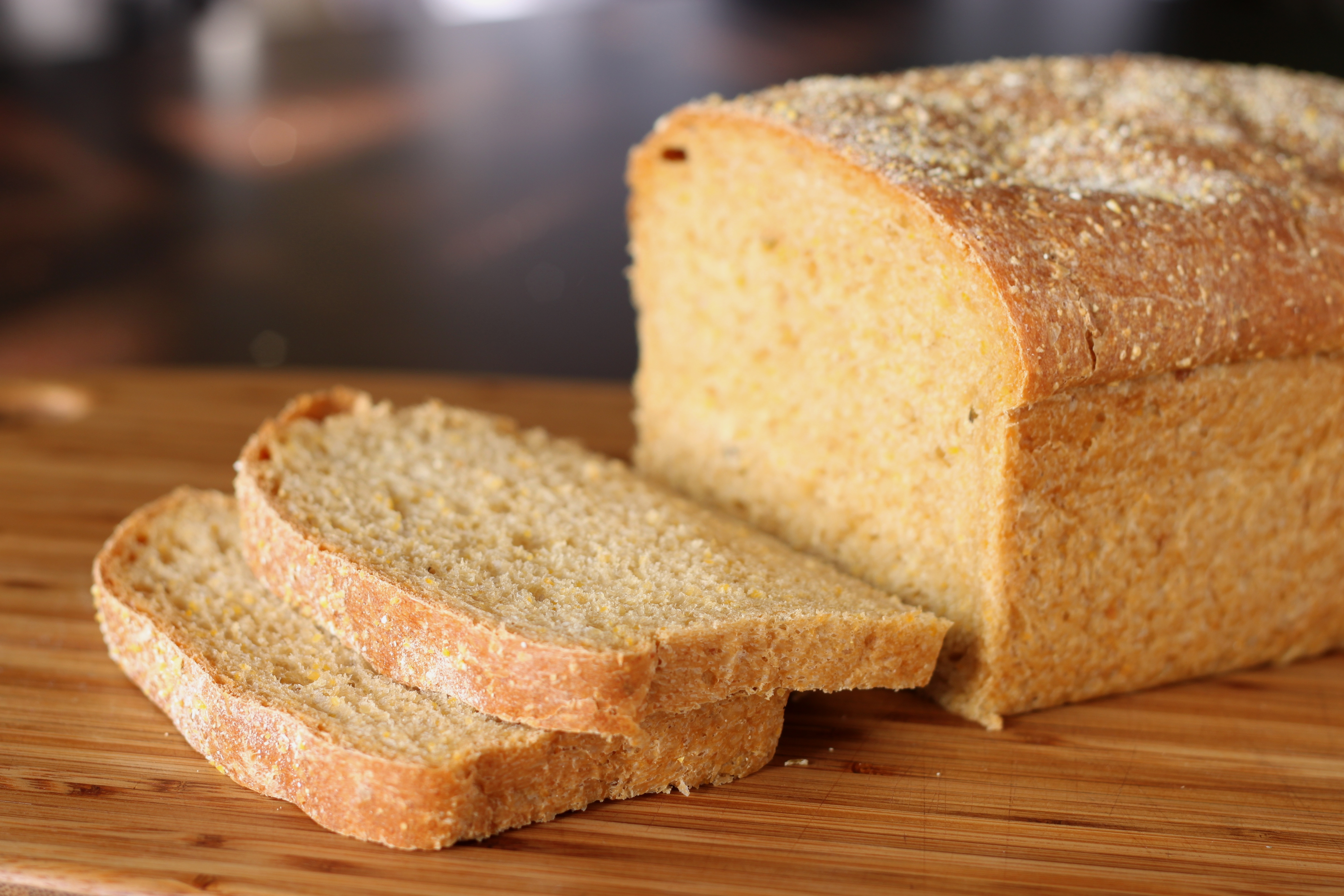
Anadama bread

This is a list of American breads. Bread is a staple food prepared from a dough of flour and water, usually by baking. Throughout recorded history it has been popular around the world and is one of humanity's oldest foods, having been of importance since the dawn of agriculture.

This list includes breads that originated in the United States.

== American breads ==
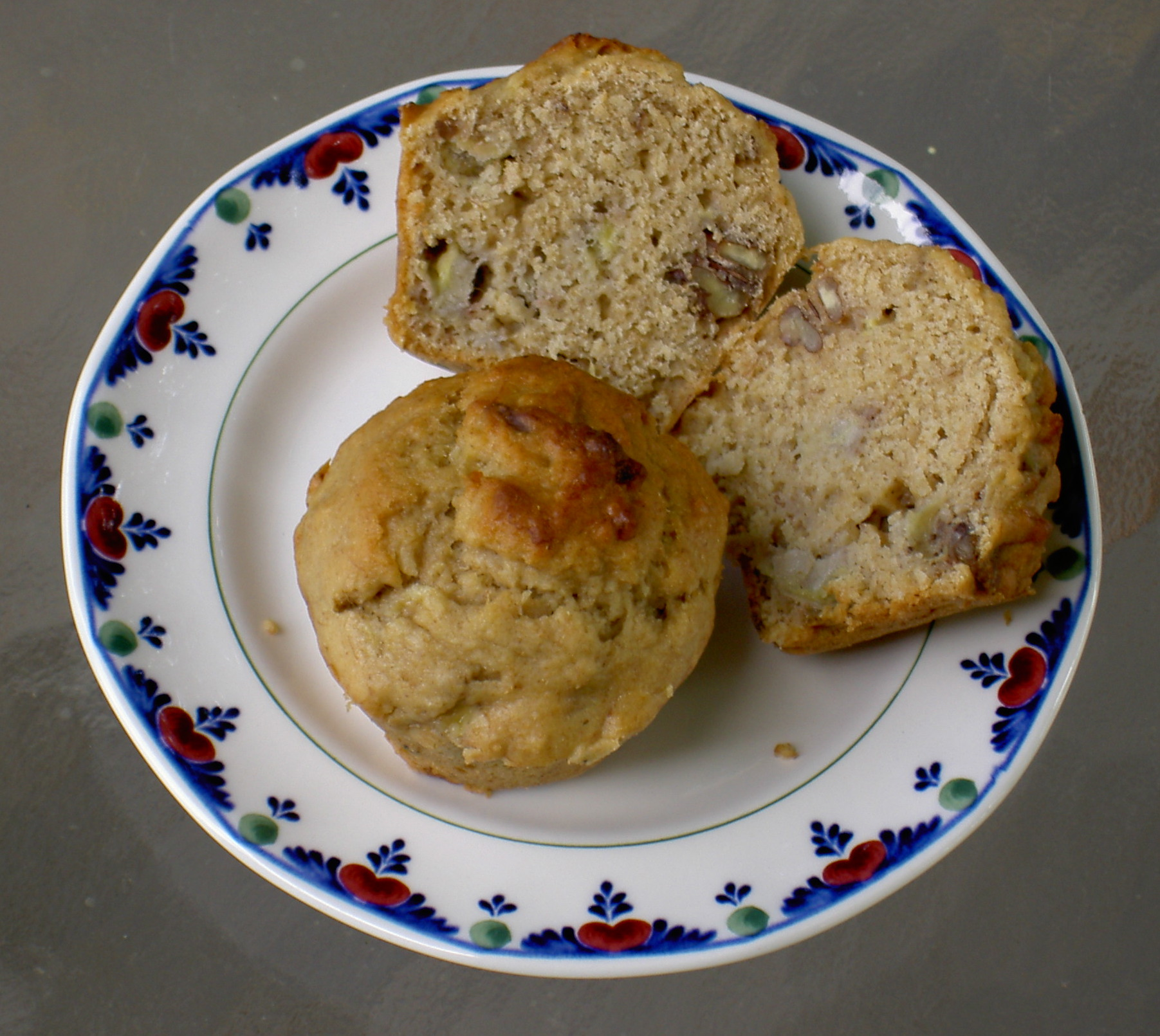
Banana nut muffins are a type of American muffin prepared using banana bread batter

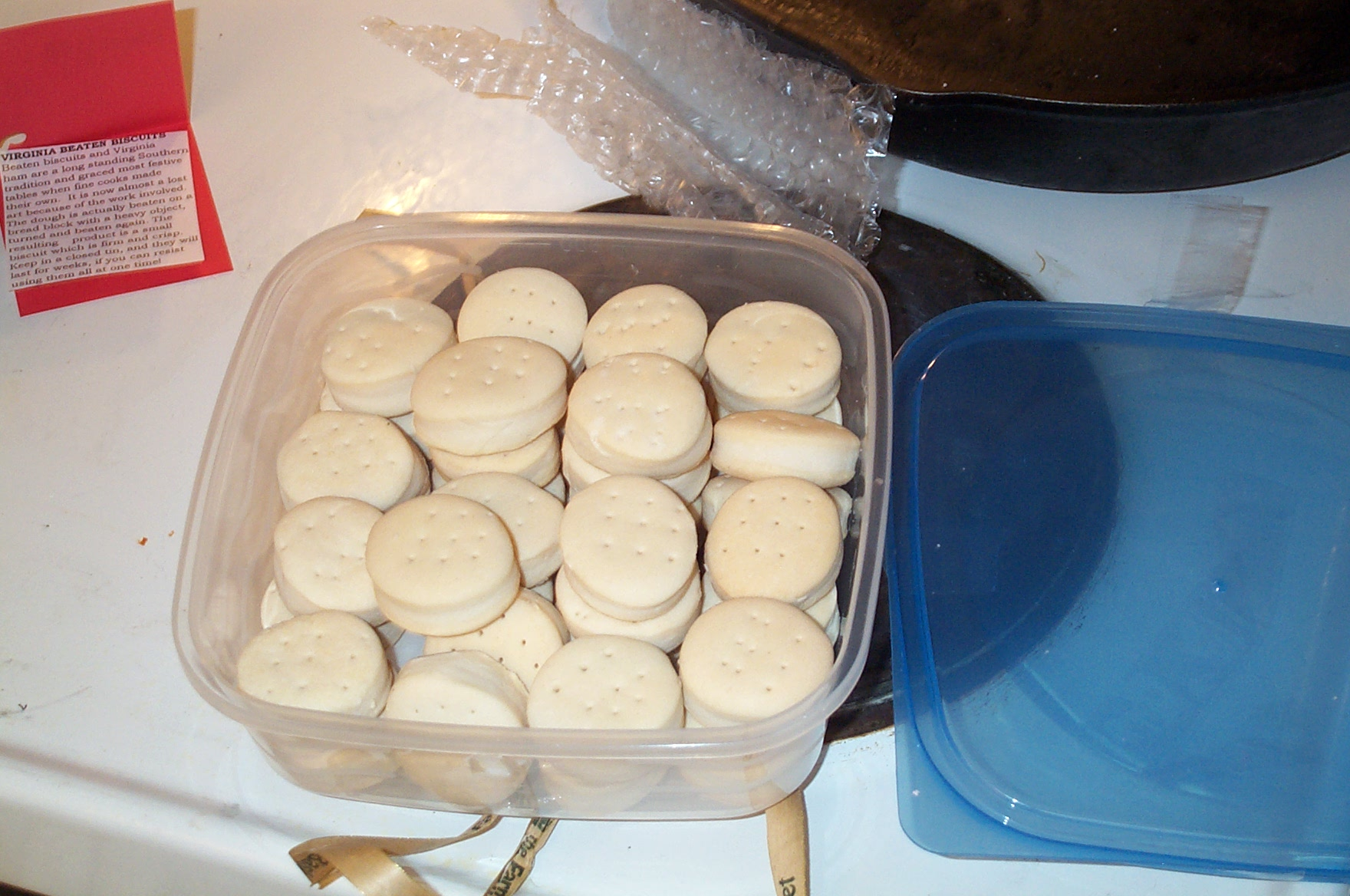
Beaten biscuits

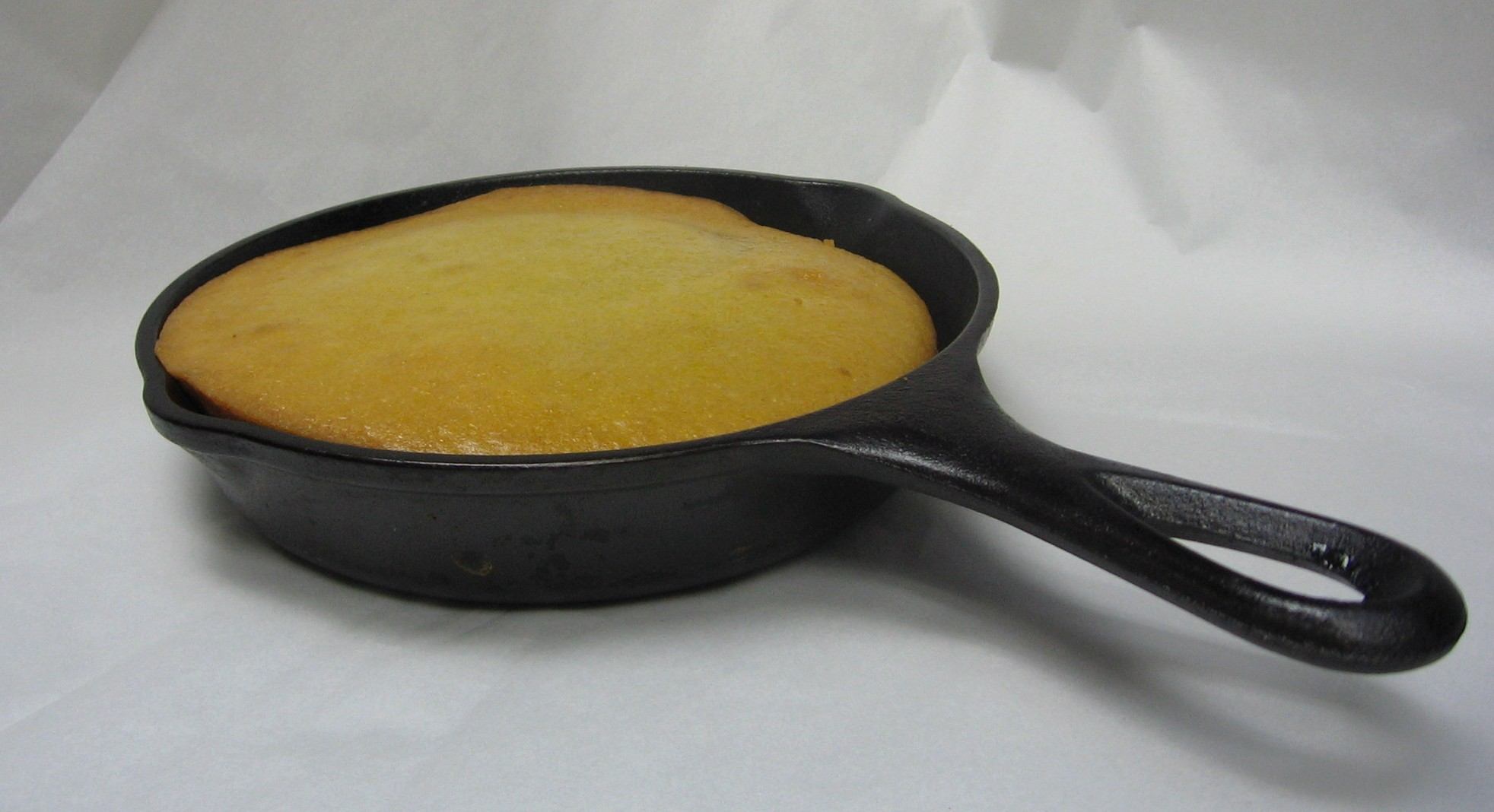
Skillet cornbread

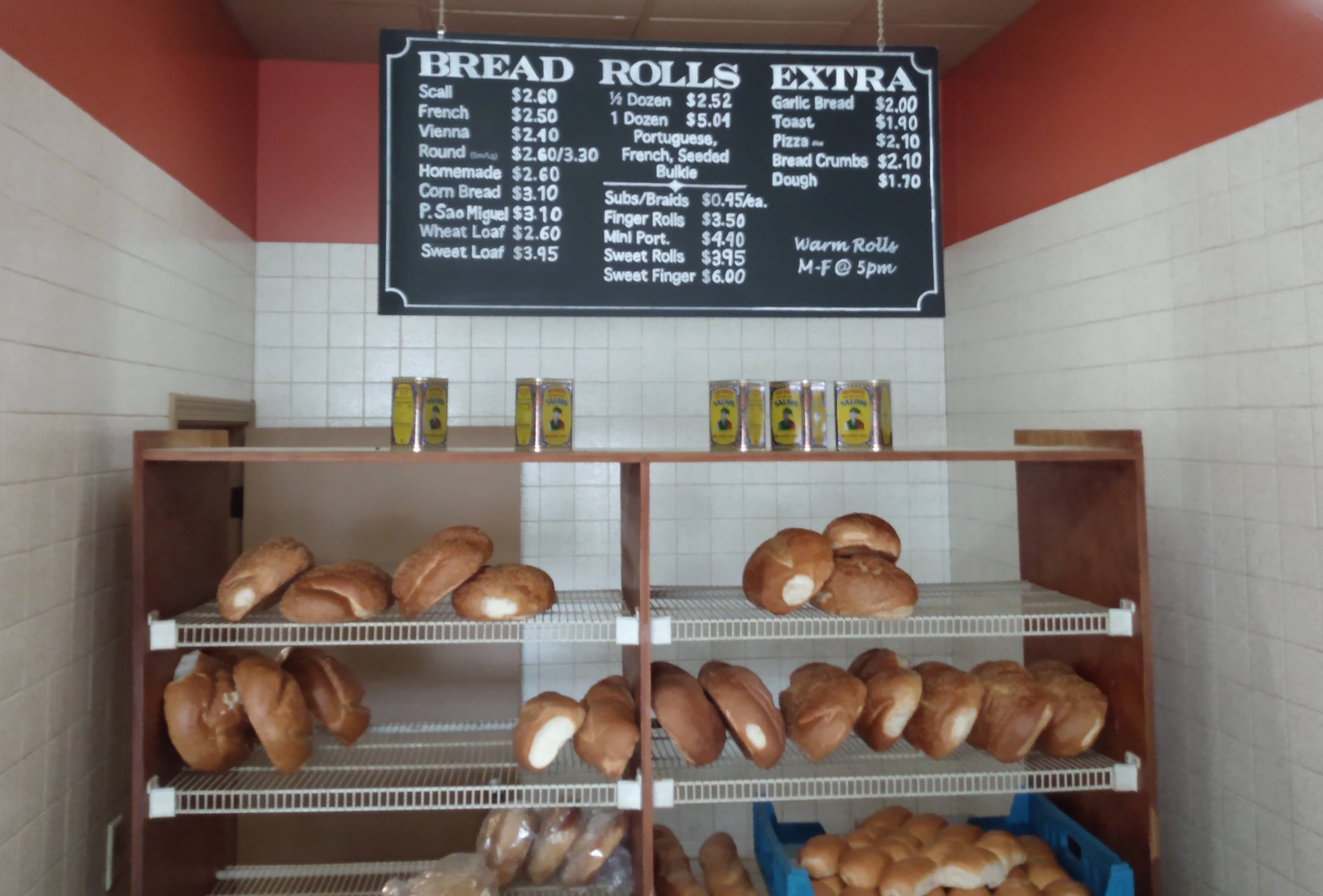
A display of Scali bread at the Winter Hill Bakery

- Adobe bread – type of bread typical of the Pueblo peoples of the Southwestern United States, it is often shaped like animals typical of the region. The dough often contains meat, vegetables, seeds, or nuts.
- Amish friendship bread
- Anadama bread – traditional yeast bread of New England in the United States made with wheat flour, cornmeal, molasses and sometimes rye flour.
- Banana bread – first became a standard feature of American cookbooks with the popularization of baking soda and baking powder in the 1930s; appeared in Pillsbury's 1933 Balanced Recipes cookbook.
- Beaten biscuit – Southern food from the United States, dating from the 19th century. They differ from regular American soft-dough biscuits in that they are more like hardtack. In New England they are called "sea biscuits", as they were staples aboard whaling ships.
- Biscuit – in the United States and parts of Canada, and widely used in popular American English, is a small bread with a firm browned crust and a soft interior.
- Boston brown bread – also known as New England brown bread
- Bulkie roll – New England regional variety of sandwich roll
- Cranberry wild rice bread
- Cornbread
- Cuban bread
- Frybread
- Garlic knot
- Graham bread – invented by Sylvester Graham in 1829 for his vegetarian diet, it was high in fiber, made with non-sifted whole-wheat flour and free from the chemical additives that were common in white bread at that time such as alum and chlorine.
- Hot water corn bread
- Hushpuppy – savory food made from cornmeal batter that is deep fried or baked rolled as a small ball or occasionally other shapes.
- American muffin
- Muffuletta – both a type of round Sicilian sesame bread and a popular sandwich originating among Italian immigrants in New Orleans, Louisiana using the same bread.
- Parker House roll – invented at the Parker House Hotel in Boston during the 1870s and still served there, it is a bread roll made by flattening the center of a ball of dough with a rolling pin so that it becomes an oval shape and then folding the oval in half.
- Pepperoni roll
- Popover
- Pullman loaf
- San Francisco sourdough - a specialty form of French bread with a crispy brown crust and a distinctly "sour" taste, which derives from the fructilactobacillus sanfranciscensis bacteria in the fermented sourdough starter. French bakers are suspected to have introduced sourdough bread to the San Francisco area during the California Gold Rush in the 1850s
- Salt-rising bread
- Scali bread
- Sloosh
- Texas toast – type of packaged bread (not sold toasted as the name implies) which is sold sliced at double the typical thickness of most sliced breads
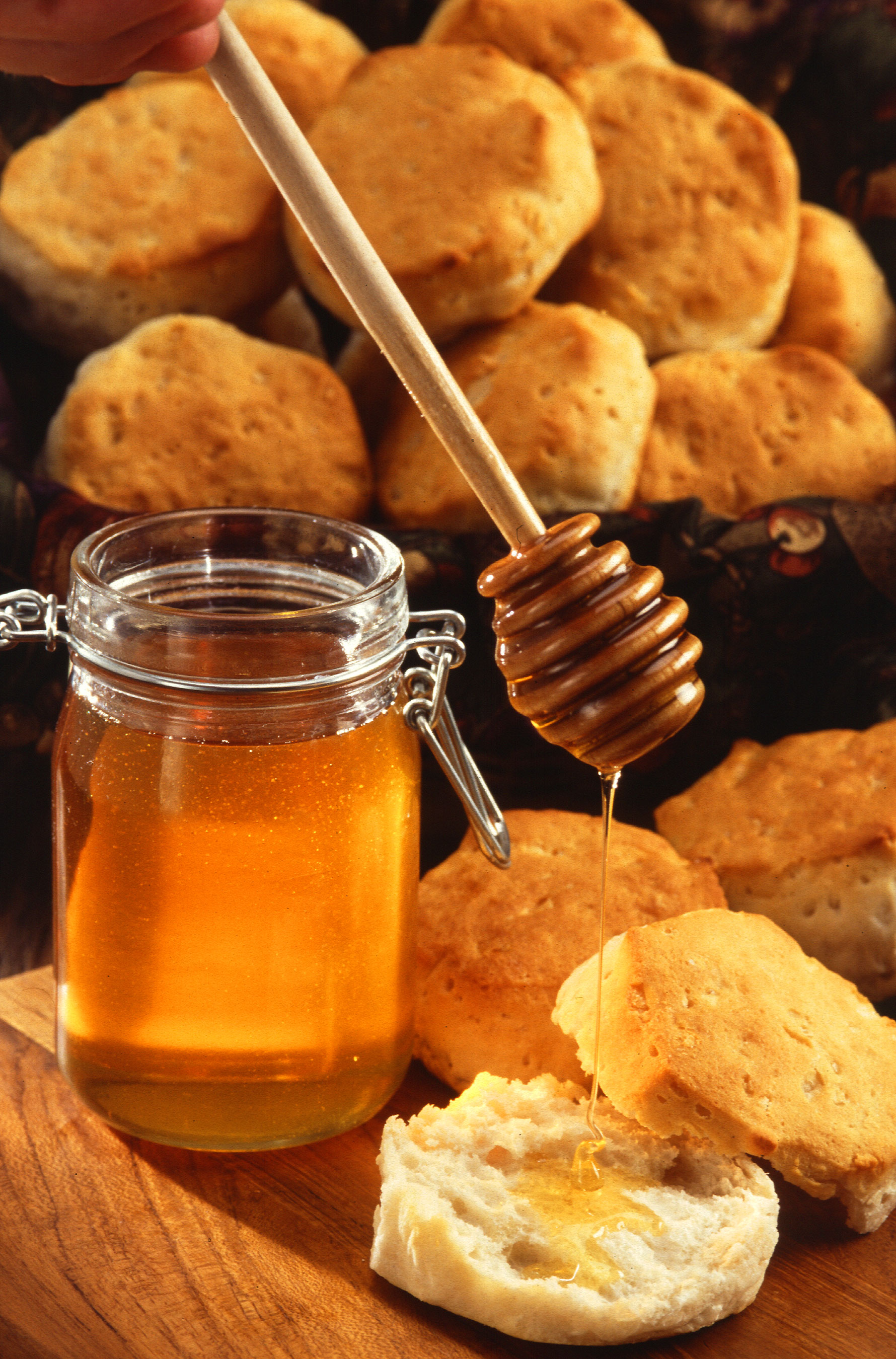
American-style biscuits, served with honey

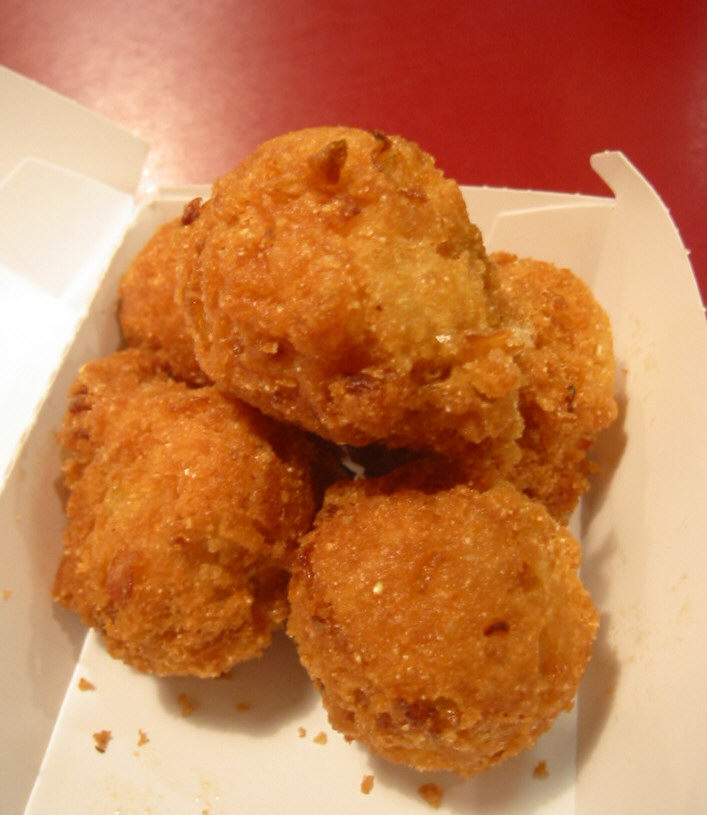
Hushpuppies

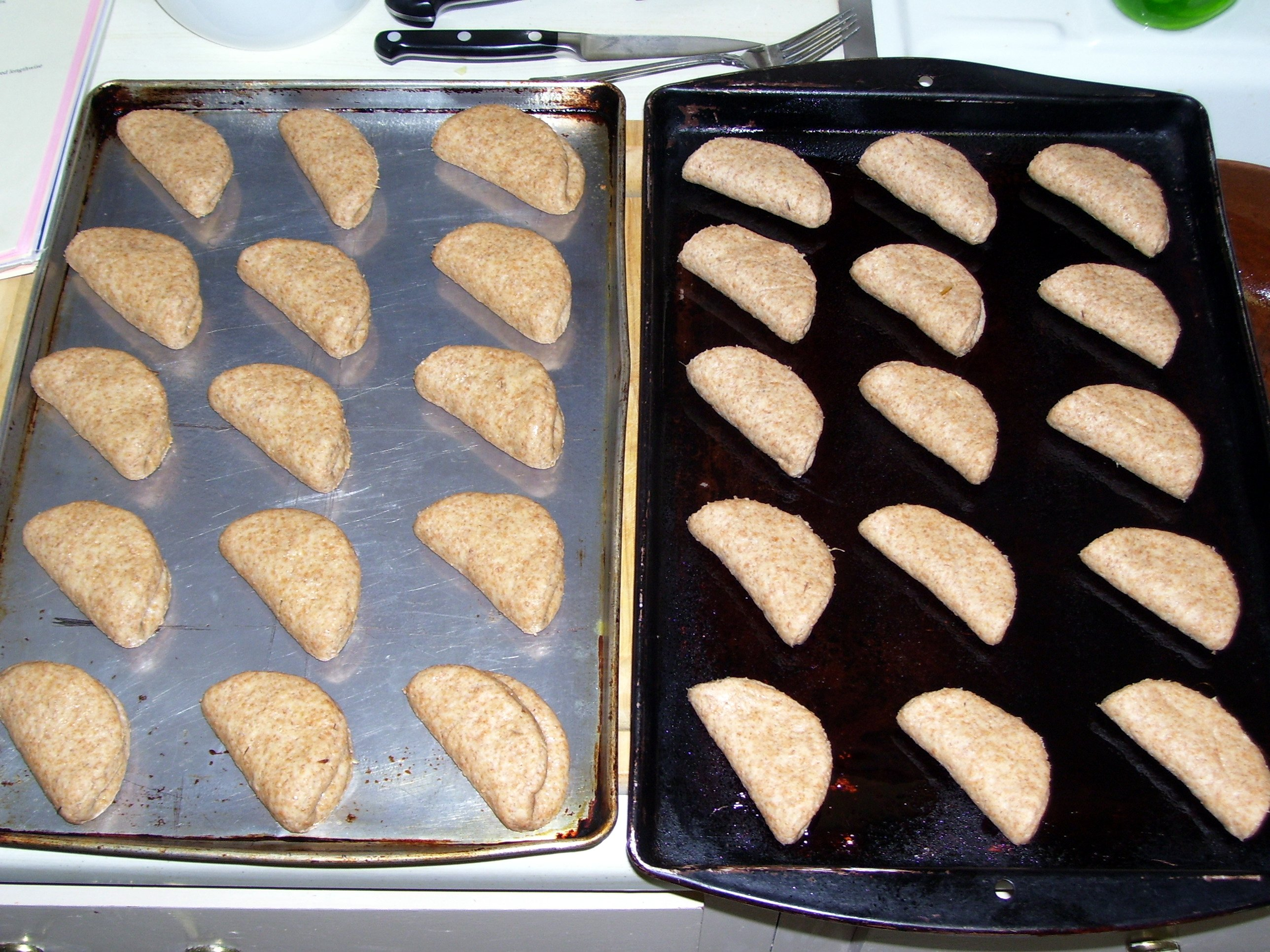
Parker House rolls

== See also ==
- Cuisine of the United States
- History of California bread
- List of American foods
- List of American sandwiches
- List of baked goods
- List of breads
- List of bread dishes
- List of bread rolls
- List of buns
