= Adobe bread =

Type of oven bread from southwest U.S.

- Alternative names: Oven bread, pueblo bread
- Type: Bread
- Place of origin: United States
- Region or state: Southwestern United States

Adobe bread, also called oven bread or pueblo bread, is a type of bread typical of the Pueblo peoples of the Southwestern United States. The bread is often shaped like animals typical of the region. The bread is baked in a beehive-shaped outdoor adobe oven known as an horno.

== Ingredients ==
The basic dough is made with yeast, flour, salt, warm water, and either butter, lard, or shortening. Sometimes eggs or a sweetener such as honey or sugar is added to the dough as well. The dough often contains meat, vegetables, seeds, or nuts.

== See also ==
- List of American breads
