= Twist bread =

Type of bread baked over open fire

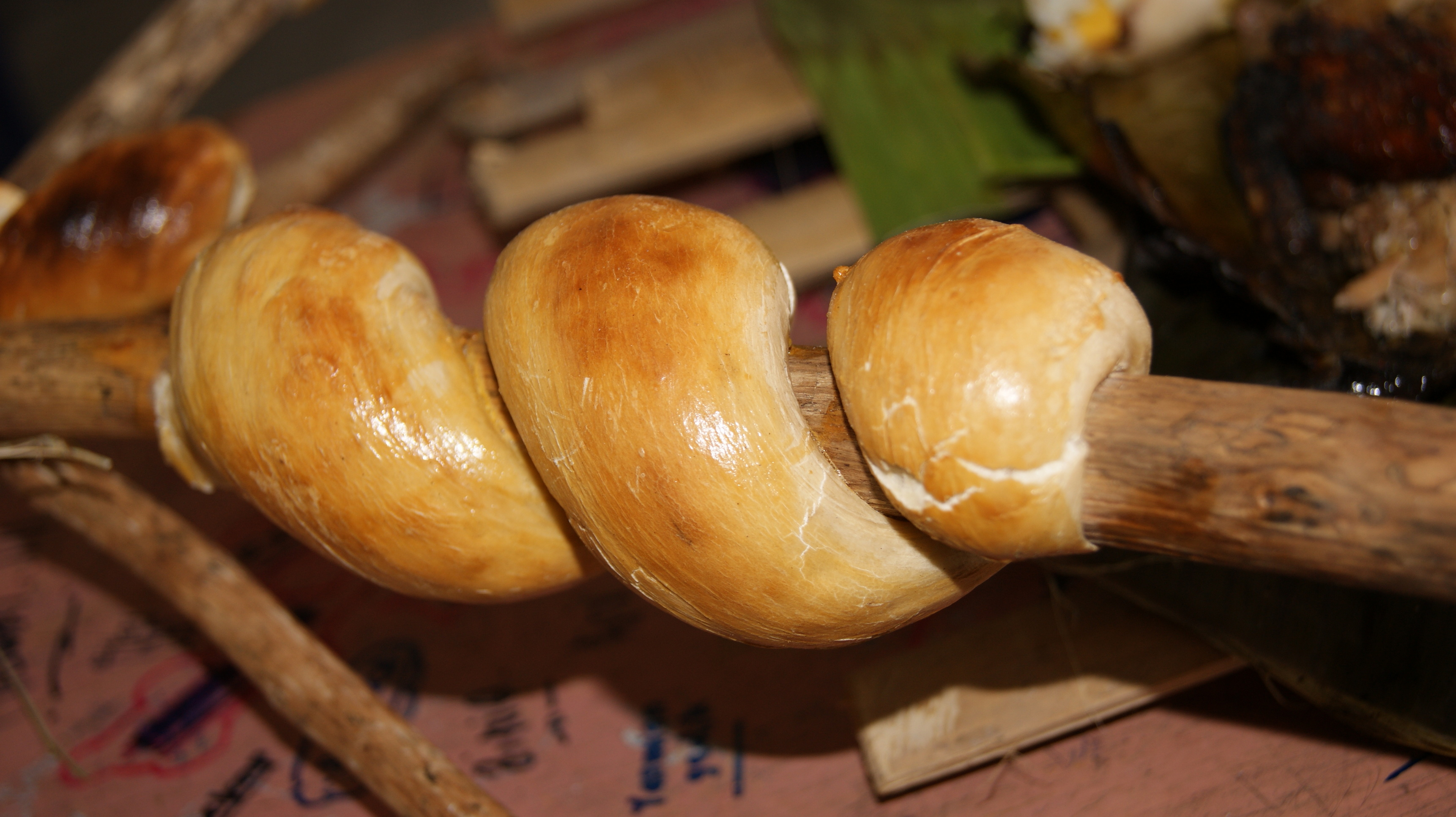
- Baking twist bread over an open fire
- Alternative names: Stick bread, campfire bread
- Type: Bread
- Main ingredients: Dough with leavening agent (usually yeast)

Twist bread or campfire bread (Danish: snobrød, "twist bread", German: Stockbrot, Norwegian: pinnebrød, Swedish: pinnbröd, "stick bread") is a type of bread in which the dough has been rolled into a long sausage shape, twisted over the end of a stick, and baked over an open fire.

The dough is an ordinary bread dough, usually with yeast as a leavening agent but baking powder may also be used.

The ideal stick is fairly straight and made of non-poisonous hardwood that will not impart a disagreeable taste; good choices include branches of birch, hazel or willow trees. The bark should be whittled away from the branch 15–20 cm in from the end, where the dough will be wrapped. The length depends on one's comfort and the fire's size. The thickness of the bread-holding end is around 1.5–2 cm. The thicker the stick, the heavier it is and thus the harder it is to hold. However, a branch that is too thin will bend under its own weight if it is freshly cut.

The bonfire should be gradually burned so far down that there are only glowing pieces of wood left, with almost no flames. The most suitable types of firewood are from hardwood trees similar to beech and oak, but other hardwoods can be used, except for poplar and aspen, which create a sour smoke. Conifers, especially fir, are unsuitable because they do not create many glowing embers, and moreover pop and spark so that cooking over such a fire can become an unpleasant and messy affair. The fire must burn down a little, so that there are not many flames, and the embers can be spread out a little so that there is enough room for the twist breads.

When the fire is ready, the dough is rolled out into a long sausage, just thick enough that the stick can bear the weight of the dough. The dough is twisted around the peeled end of the stick, starting from the outside. The ends are smashed closed so that the dough will not unravel.

The dough is then baked over coals, not flames. The baker must keep a good distance of about 15–30 cm and turn the stick regularly so that the bread is baked evenly. Tired arms may result in the bread dipping down into the fire pit, so a log or the like can be used to keep the branch upright.

When the bread sounds hollow over its whole body when tapped gently with a knife, it is done and can be gently pulled off the stick when it has cooled down enough. It can be eaten by itself or with butter, marmalade, cheese, and the like. If the dimensions of the stick are similar to a hot dog, one can squirt ketchup, mustard and other toppings into the hole of the twist bread and stick a boiled or roasted sausage inside. In this case it is most practical to be careful in the positioning of the dough, so that there are no cracks.

== Traditions ==
Twist bread is often made and eaten to celebrate Sankt Hans Aften, also known as Midsummer's Eve. Sankt Hans Aften originally celebrated the summer solstice, but was later associated with the Christian feast day of St. John the Baptist. Now the holiday is more widely regarded as a time to gather with friends and family and celebrate a feeling of togetherness by lighting bonfires, drinking, and cooking food such as twist bread.

== See also ==
- Tortilla de rescoldo
- Damper (food)
- Sloosh
- List of breads
