= Horno =

Native American oven

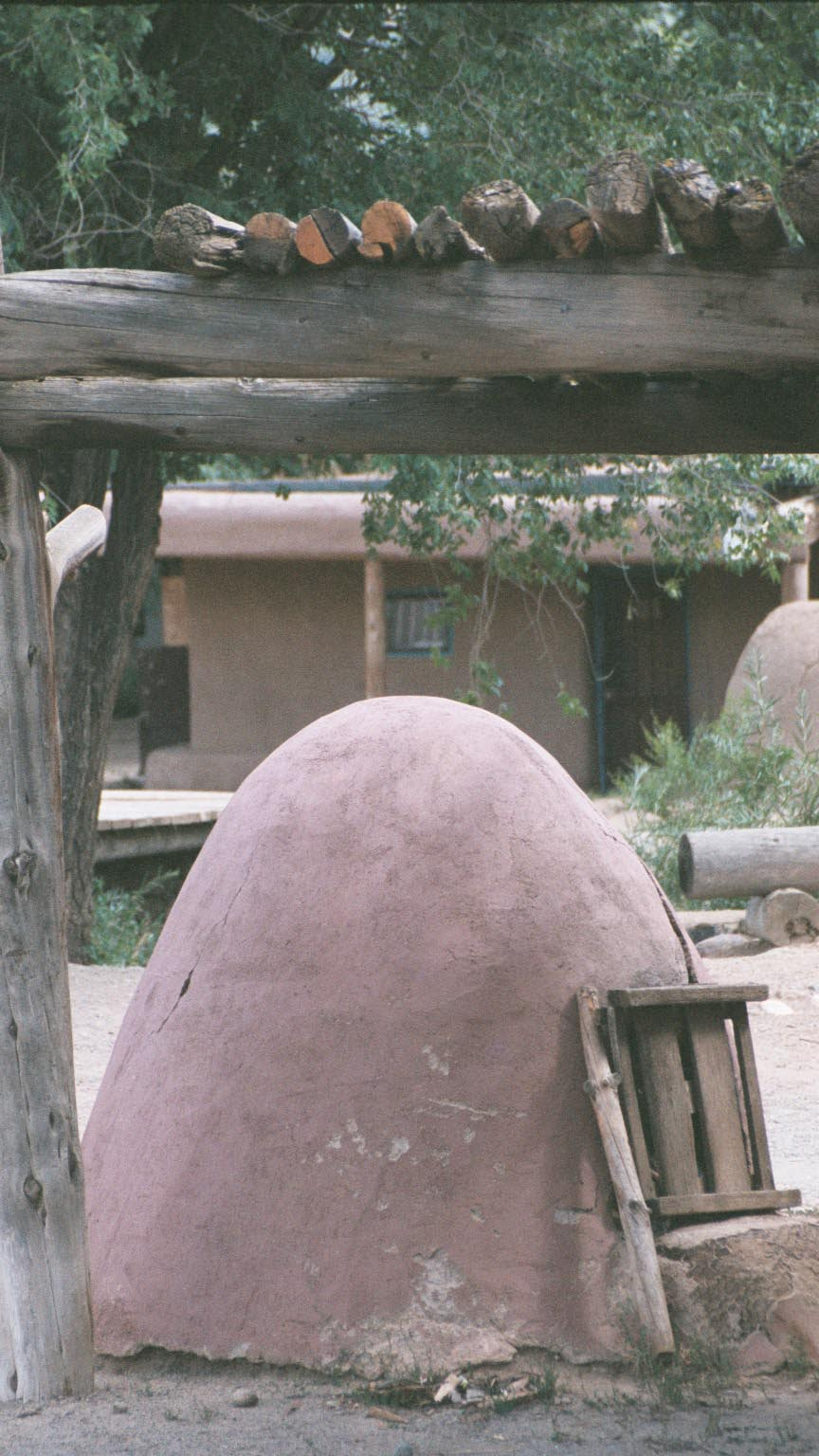
A horno at Taos Pueblo in New Mexico in 2003.

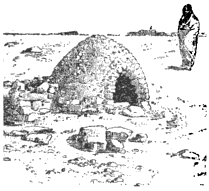
a Pueblo oven

Horno (/ˈɔːrnoʊ/ OR-noh; Spanish: [ˈoɾno]) is a mud adobe-built outdoor oven used by the Native Americans and the early settlers of North America. This type of oven was also used and introduced to the Iberian Peninsula by the Moors, it was quickly adopted and carried to all Spanish-occupied lands. The horno has a beehive shape and uses wood as the heat source. The procedure, still used in parts of New Mexico and Arizona, is to build a fire inside the horno and, when the proper amount of time has passed, remove the embers and ashes and insert the bread to be cooked. In the case of corn, the embers are doused with water and the corn is then inserted into the horno to be steam-cooked. When cooking meats, the oven is fired to a "white hot" temperature (approximately 650 °F or 343 °C), the coals are moved to the back of the oven, and the meats are placed inside. The smoke hole and door are sealed with mud. A twenty-one-pound turkey takes 2 1/2 to 3 hours to be cooked.

Horno is the usual Spanish word for 'oven' or 'furnace', and is derived from the Latin word furnus.

"Young women must master the art of using the oven to bake piki, a tasty, delicate paper-thin bread made of cornmeal, before they are considered fit for marriage."

== See also ==
- Adobe bread
- Clay oven
- List of ovens
- Kemence (in Hungarian)
