= Scali bread =

Braided Italian-American bread from Boston

- Type: Bread
- Place of origin: United States
- Region or state: Boston, Massachusetts
- Main ingredients: flour, water, yeast, sesame seeds

Scali bread is an Italian-American style of bread made predominantly in the Boston, Massachusetts, area. It is a braided loaf that is covered in sesame seeds. The earliest known documented references to scali bread suggest that it was created by the Fitchburg-based Brockelman's Brothers grocery chain on or before 1941, and is now a regional specialty.

Available at many bakeries in the Boston area, a scali can be purchased intact or quickly sliced on an industrial bread slicer. One bakery that has been making the traditional form for decades is the Winter Hill Bakery in Somerville.

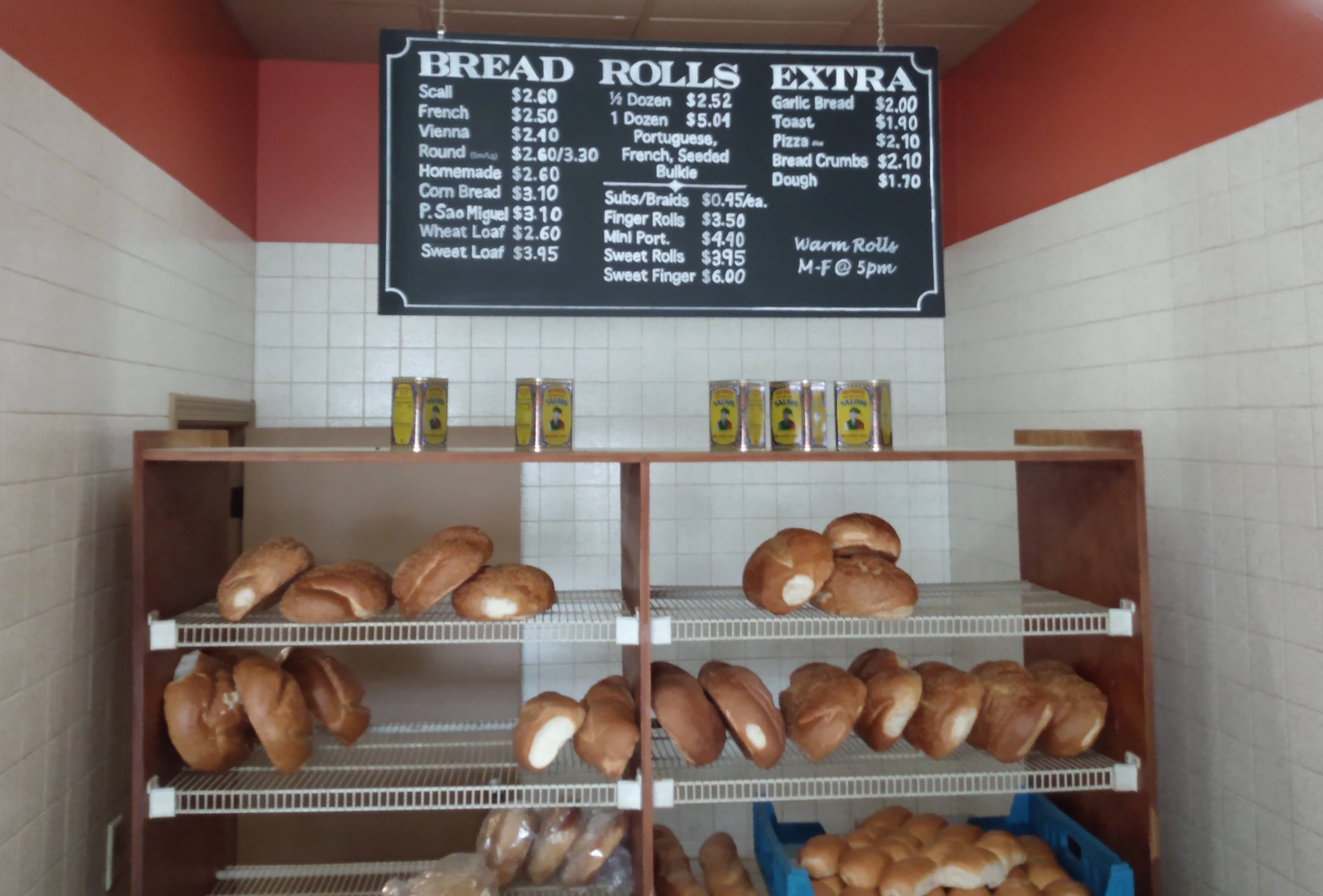
Traditional bakery shelves of Scali bread, with pricing, 2023. Winter Hill Bakery, Somerville MA.

== See also ==
- List of American breads
