= Beaten biscuit =

Type of biscuit

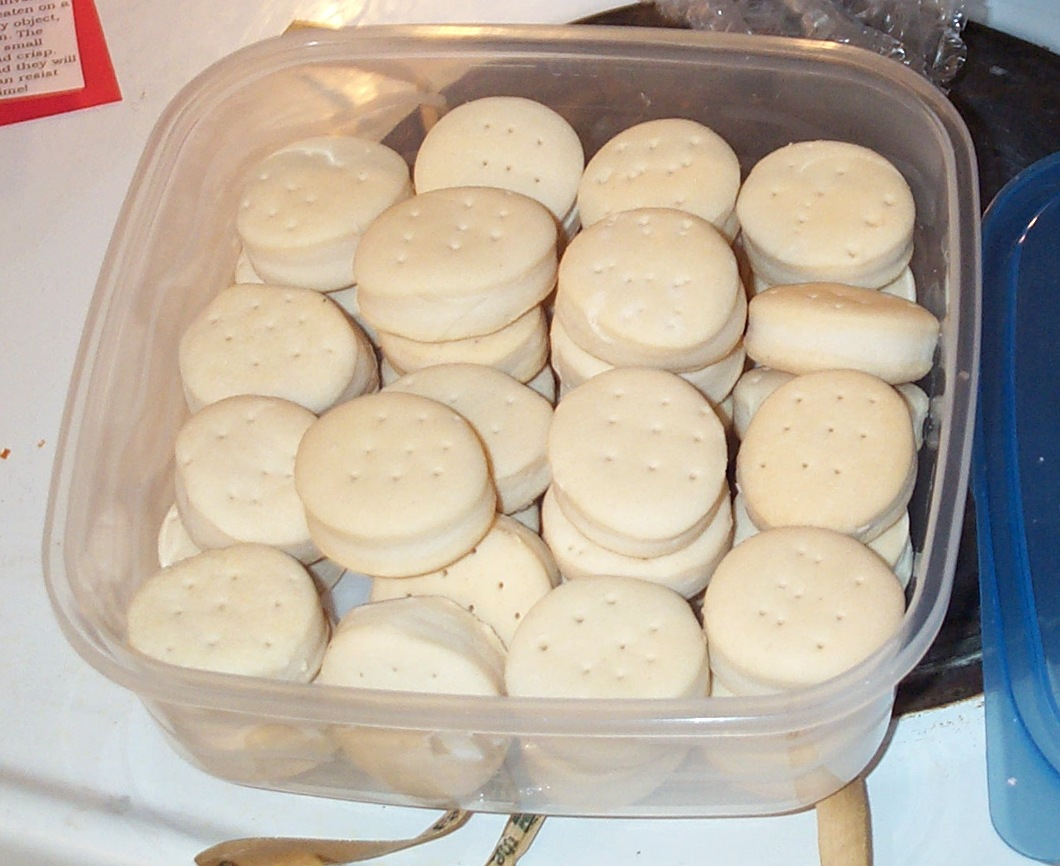
- Alternative names: Sea biscuits
- Type: Biscuit
- Place of origin: United States
- Region or state: Southern United States
- Main ingredients: Flour, salt, sugar, lard, cold water

Beaten biscuits are a baked good associated with the Southern United States, dating from the 19th century. They differ from regular American soft-dough biscuits in that they are more like hardtack. In New England they are called "sea biscuits", as they were staples aboard whaling ships. Beaten biscuits are also historically associated with Maryland cuisine.

== Characteristics and preparation ==
The dough was originally made from flour, salt, sugar, lard, and cold water. Modern recipes may add baking powder. The biscuits are beaten with a hard object or against a hard surface, then pricked with a fork prior to baking, and cut smaller than regular biscuits. The prepared dough is baked at 325 °F (163 °C) for 20 minutes until tops are golden brown, but some bakers prefer a crisp, white biscuit that is baked with no browning.

How long the biscuits are beaten varies from one recipe to the next, from "at least 15 minutes" to "30 to 45 minutes." The beating these biscuits undergo is severe: they are banged with a "rolling pin, hammer, or side of an axe"; or they are "pounded with a blunt instrument...[even] a tire iron will do...Granny used to beat 'em with a musket"; one book "instructs the cook to 'use boys to do it'"—that is, beat the biscuits vigorously—"at least 200 times". Smithsonian Magazine stated that "the 'prolonged and violent' work was often relegated to enslaved cooks". Besides ensuring the proper texture for the biscuit, "this beating also serves to vent the cook's weekly accumulation of pent-up frustrations."

== Uses ==
These biscuits were traditionally used in "ham biscuits", a traditional Southern canapé, where they are sliced horizontally and spread with butter, jelly, mustard and filled with pieces of country ham, or used to sop up gravy or syrup. They are sometimes considered "Sunday biscuits" and can be stored for several months in an airtight container. Beaten biscuits were once so popular that special machines, called biscuits brakes, were manufactured to knead the dough in home kitchens. A biscuit brake typically consists of a pair of steel rollers geared together and operated by a crank, mounted on a small table with a marble top and cast iron legs.

Due to extensive work required to make beaten biscuits, they grew steadily less popular until the advent of modern household appliances, including the food processor, which made them considerably easier to make. Ham biscuits are still widely found in the United States but are often made with standard biscuits or dinner rolls.

== See also ==
- List of American breads
- List of regional dishes of the United States
- Annie Fisher's "old Missouri style"
