= Bernarr Macfadden =

American physical culturist and magazine publisher (1868–1955)

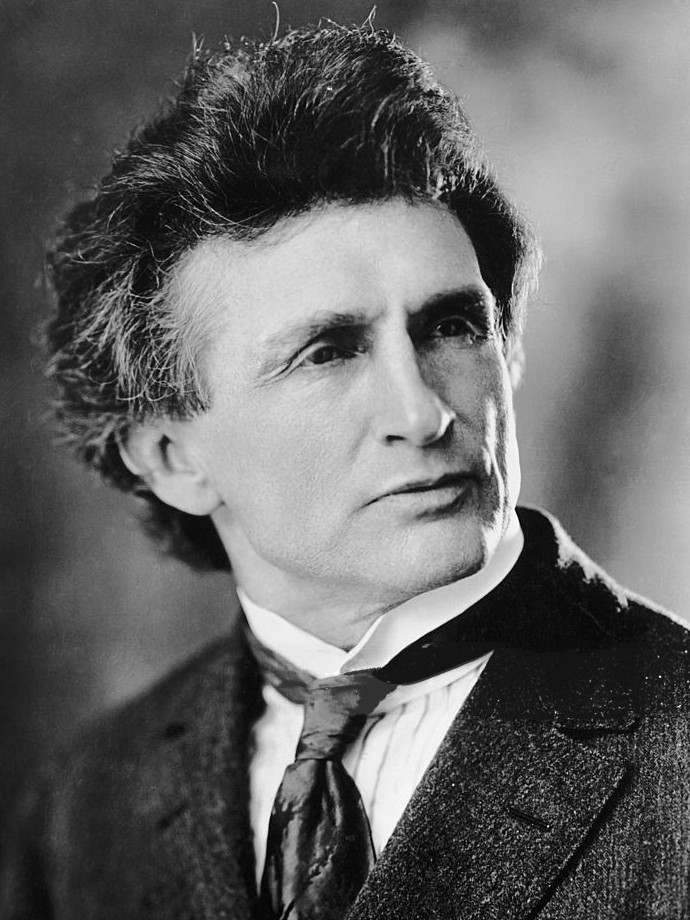
- Macfadden, c. 1910
- Born: Bernard Adolphus McFadden; August 16, 1868; Mill Spring, Missouri, U.S.
- Died: October 12, 1955 (aged 87); Jersey City, New Jersey, U.S.
- Resting place: Woodlawn Cemetery
- Occupations: Bodybuilder, author, magazine publisher
- Known for: Founder of Macfadden Publications

Bernarr Macfadden (born Bernard Adolphus McFadden, August 16, 1868 – October 12, 1955) was an American proponent of physical culture, a combination of bodybuilding with nutritional and health theories. He founded the long-running magazine publishing company Macfadden Publications.

== Biography ==
=== Early life ===
Born in Mill Spring, Missouri, Macfadden changed his first and last names to give them a greater appearance of strength. He thought "Bernarr" sounded like the roar of a lion, and that "Macfadden" was a more masculine spelling of his last name.

As a young child, Macfadden was weak and sickly. After being orphaned by the time he was 11, he was placed with a farmer and began working on the farm. He claimed that hard work and wholesome food on the farm turned him into a strong and fit boy. When he was 13, however, he moved to St. Louis and took a desk job. Quickly his health reverted again and by 16 he described himself as a "physical wreck". He started exercising again with dumbbells, walking up to six miles a day with a lead weight in his clothes, and he became a vegetarian. He claimed to quickly regain his previous health.

=== Publishing and writings ===
In 1899, Macfadden founded Physical Culture (1899–1951?), an American magazine on bodybuilding, health, and fitness, and was editor up to the August 1912 issue.

In May 1919, readers' letters to Physical Culture magazine which told their personal stories resulted in a new magazine, True Story. Aided by long-time Supervising Editor Fulton Oursler, Macfadden eventually grew a publishing empire, including Liberty, Dream World, Ghost Stories, the once-familiar movie magazine Photoplay, and the tabloid newspaper, The New York Evening Graphic. Macfadden's magazines included SPORT, a preeminent sports magazine prior to Time Inc.'s Sports Illustrated.

Ghost Stories was a nod in the direction of the rapidly growing field of pulp magazines, though it was a large-size magazine that preserved Macfadden's confessional style for most of its stories. In 1928, Macfadden made more overt moves into the pulps with, for example, Red Blooded Stories (1928–29), Flying Stories (1928–29), and Tales of Danger and Daring (1929). These were all unsuccessful. In 1929, Macfadden underwrote Harold Hersey's pulp chain, the Good Story Magazine Company. Macfadden titles like Ghost Stories and Flying Stories continued as Good Story publications. Other intended Macfadden pulps, like Thrills of the Jungle (1929) and Love and War Stories (1930), originated as Good Story magazines. In 1931, Macfadden purchased the assets of the Mackinnon-Fly magazine publishers, which gave him the pioneering sci-fi pulp Amazing Stories, and several other titles; they were published under the Teck Publications imprint. This apparently made Good Story expendable and financial support was withdrawn almost immediately. The Teck titles lasted under Macfadden control until being sold in the late '30s, after which Macfadden was absent from the pulp field.

Macfadden also contributed to many articles and books including The Virile Powers of Superb Manhood (1900), MacFadden's Encyclopedia of Physical Culture (1911–1912), Fasting for Health (1923), and The Milk Diet (1923).

=== Health advocacy ===
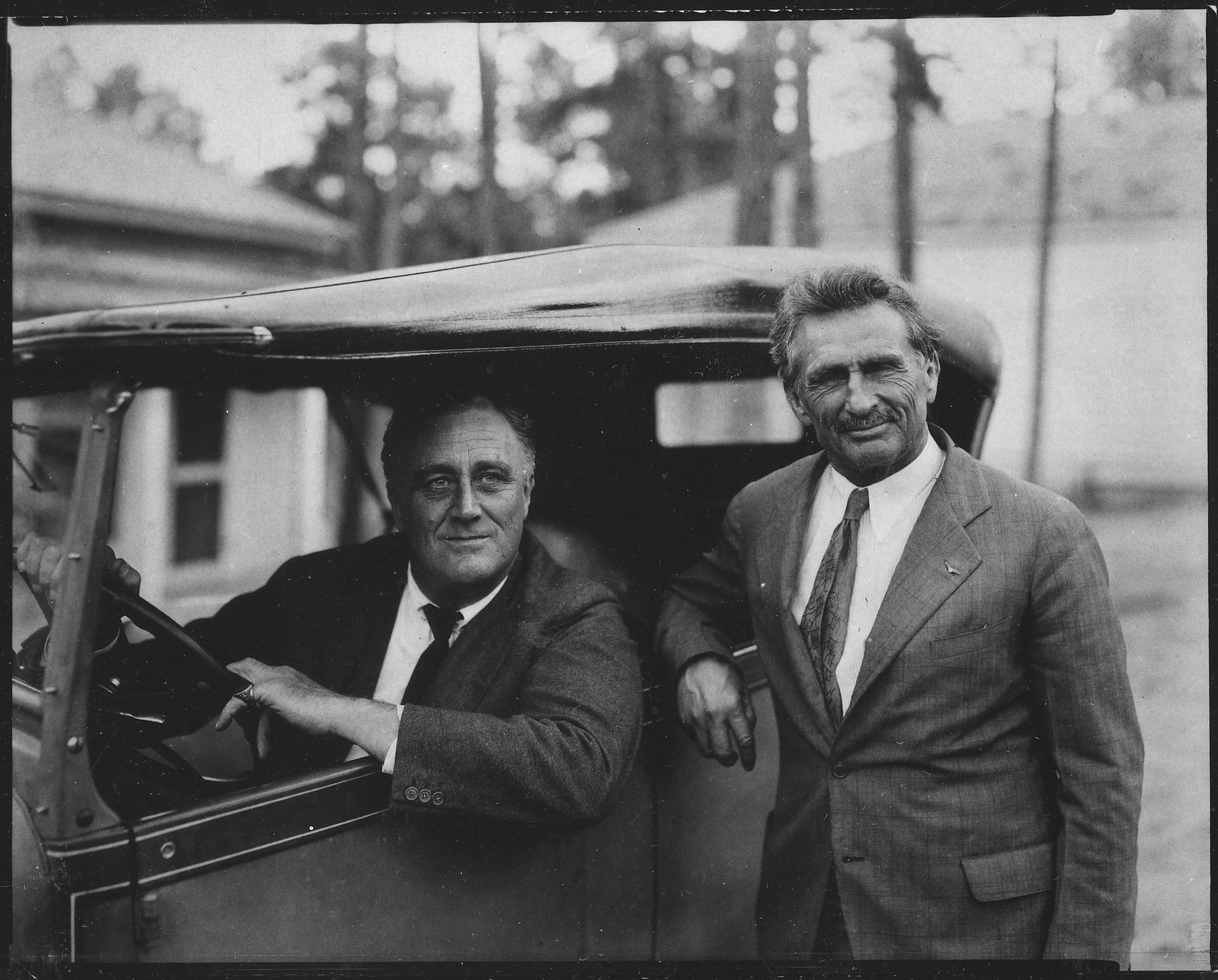
With Franklin D. Roosevelt in Warm Springs, Georgia, 1931

Macfadden popularized the practice of fasting that previously had been associated with illnesses such as anorexia nervosa. He felt strongly that fasting was one of the surest ways to physical health. Many of his subjects would fast for a week to rejuvenate their body. He claimed that through fasting "a person could exercise unqualified control over virtually all types of disease while revealing a degree of strength and stamina such as would put others to shame". He saw fasting as an instrument with which to prove a man's superiority over other men.

Macfadden had photographs of himself taken before and after fasts to demonstrate their positive effects on the body. For example, one photograph showed Macfadden lifting a 100-pound dumbbell over his head immediately after a seven-day fast. Macfadden acknowledged the difficulties of fasting and did not support it as an ascetic practice, but rather because he believed its ultimate benefits outweighed its costs.

He was particularly opposed to the consumption of white bread, which he called the "staff of death".

Macfadden established many "healthatoriums" in the eastern and midwestern states. These institutions offered educational programs, such as "The Physical Culture Training School". Although he gained his reputation for physical culture and fitness, he gained much notoriety for his views on sexual behavior. He viewed intercourse as a healthy activity and not solely a procreative one; this was a different attitude than most physicians had at the time. He also attempted to found a "Physical Culture City" in Monroe Township, Middlesex County, New Jersey, which folded after a few years and became the vacation-cabin neighborhood, and, later, suburban development of Outcalt. The home of John Warne Herbert Jr. in Helmetta, New Jersey was designated as "Physical Culture City’s Health Home No.1."

Nicknamed "Body Love Macfadden" by Time – a moniker he detested – he was branded a "kook" and a charlatan by many, arrested on obscenity charges, and denounced by the medical establishment. Throughout his life, he campaigned tirelessly against "pill-pushers", processed foods, and prudery.

Macfadden made an unsuccessful attempt to found a religion, "cosmotarianism", based on physical culture. He claimed that his regimen would enable him to reach the age of 150.

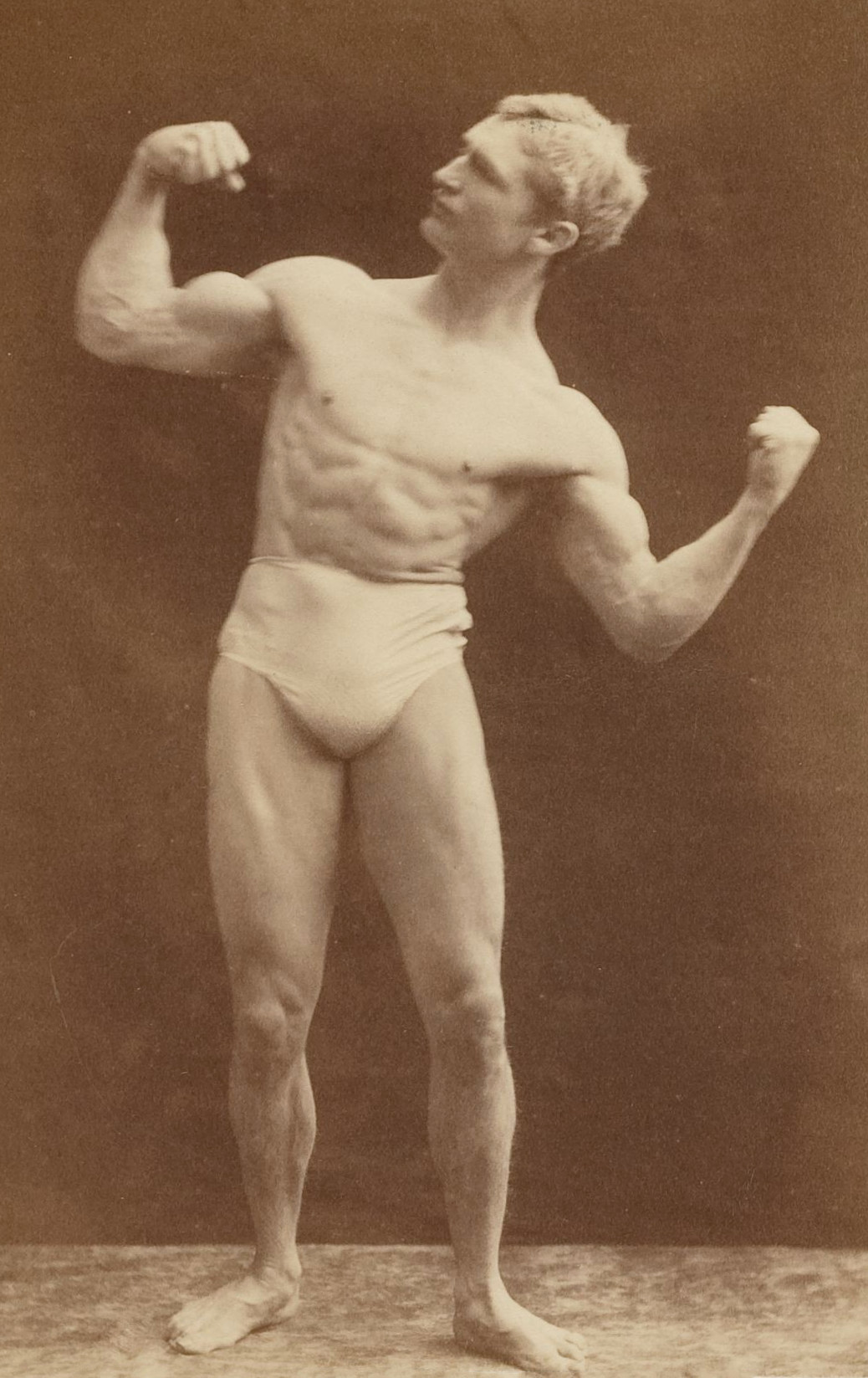
c. 1905

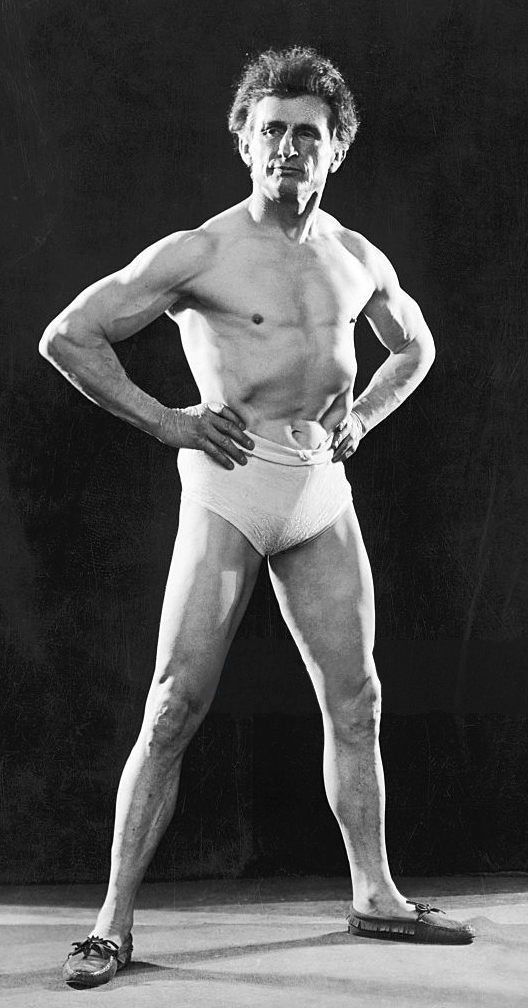
In 1923

=== Other enterprises ===
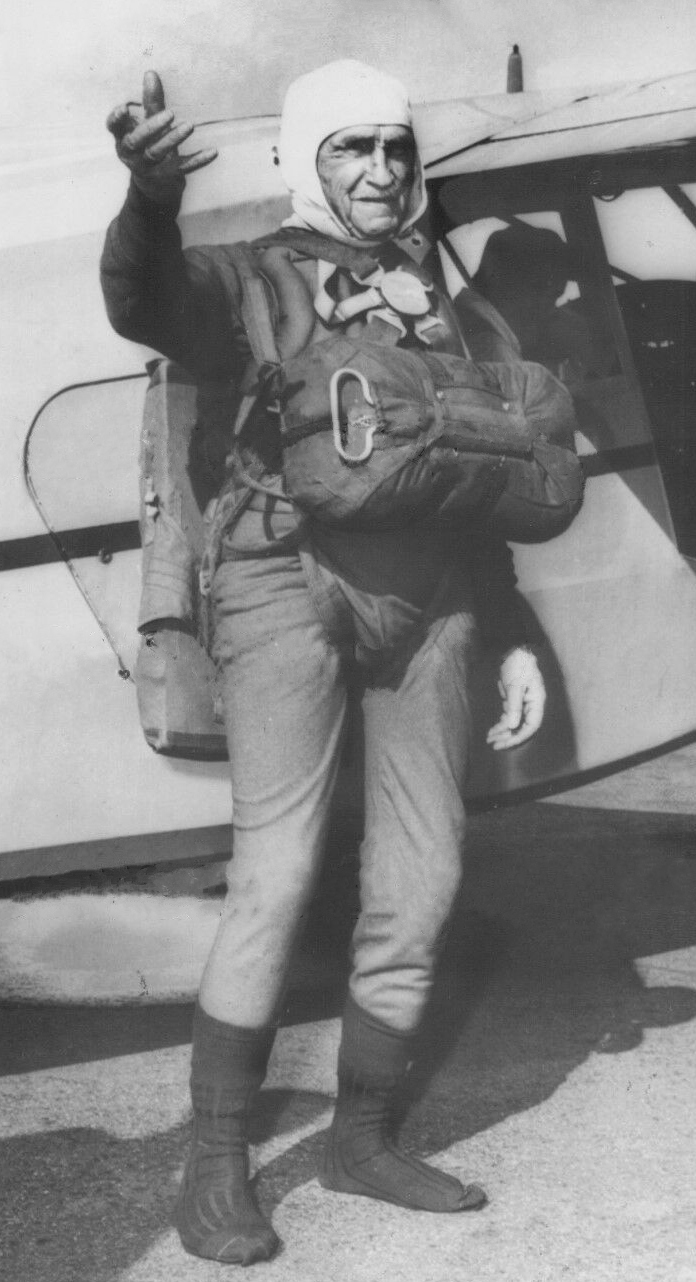
Macfadden skydiving in 1951

At the peak of his career, Macfadden owned several hotels and a major building in Dansville, New York. He also opened a restaurant in New York City in 1902 called Physical Culture, which was one of the city's first vegetarian venues. Physical Culture vegetarian restaurants were established in other cities such as Philadelphia and Chicago. By 1911, there were twenty such restaurants. Macfadden was a proponent of raw foodism and a follower of Sylvester Graham's philosophies.

His Macfadden Foundation established two boarding schools for young boys and girls in Westchester County, New York: the Macfadden School in Briarcliff Manor (Scarborough), originally for ages 4 – 12, and the Tarrytown School in Tarrytown. On March 7, 1943, the advertisement in The New York Times Magazine for the Tarrytown School read: "To Meet the Needs of a Nation at War". The boys at the Tarrytown School wore uniforms and were subject to military-type discipline and corporal punishment. The Macfadden School operated from 1936 to 1950, and the Tarrytown School operated from 1943 to 1954.

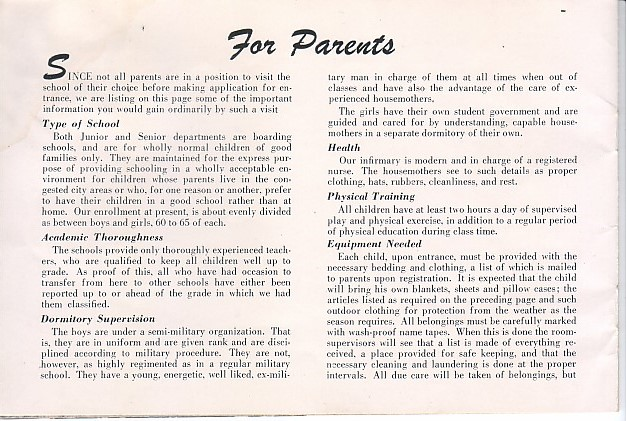
Page from Tarrytown School Brochure

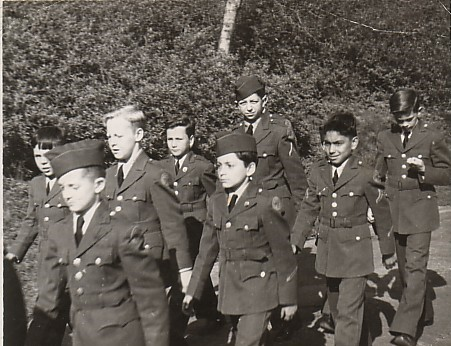
Boys in dress uniform, 1948 or 1949, Macfadden's Tarrytown School

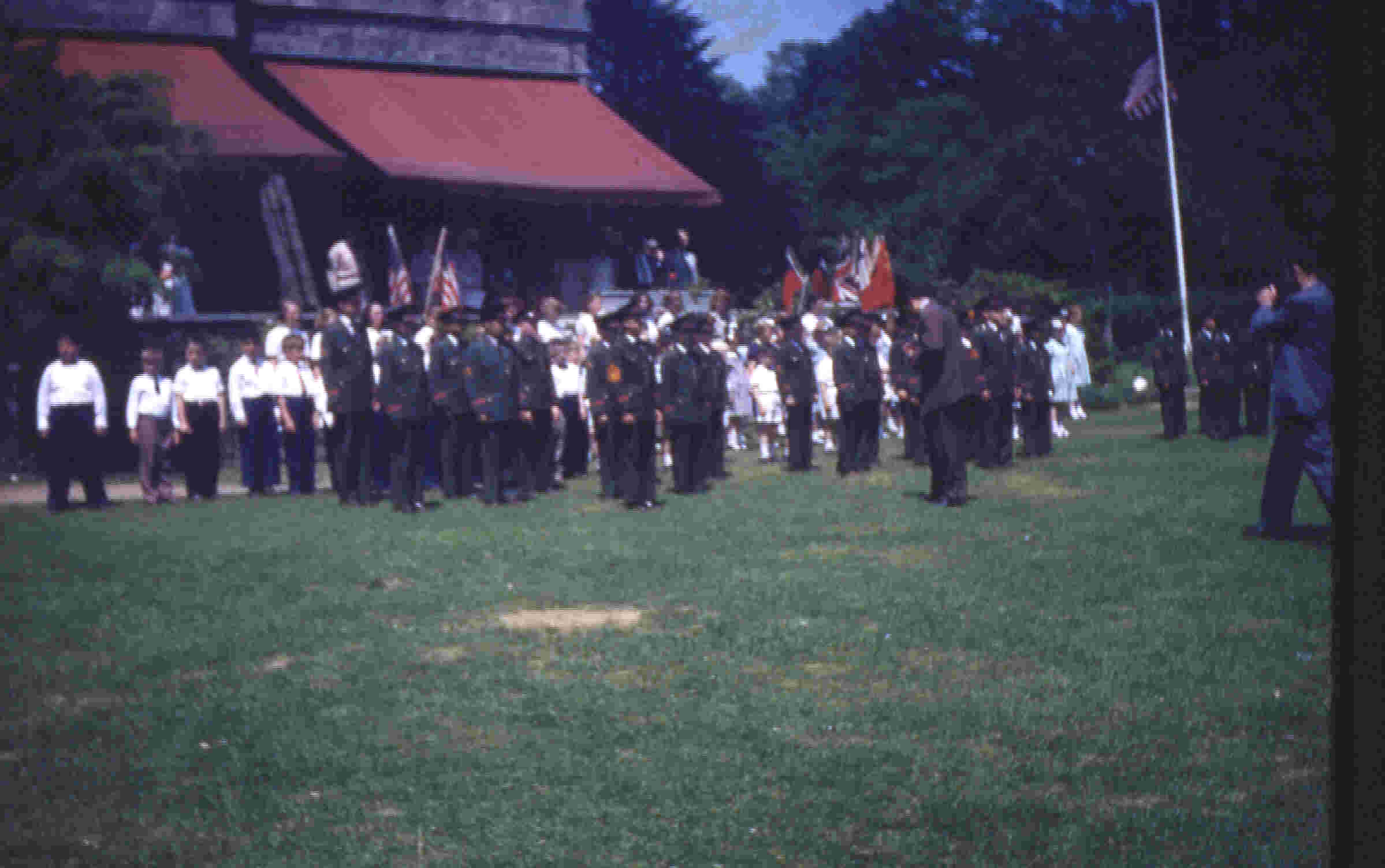
Graduation exercises, June 1953, Macfadden's Tarrytown School

The Macfadden Foundation also operated Castle Heights Military Academy in Lebanon, Tennessee. The foundation began in 1931 when he gave $50 million to it.

=== Personal life ===
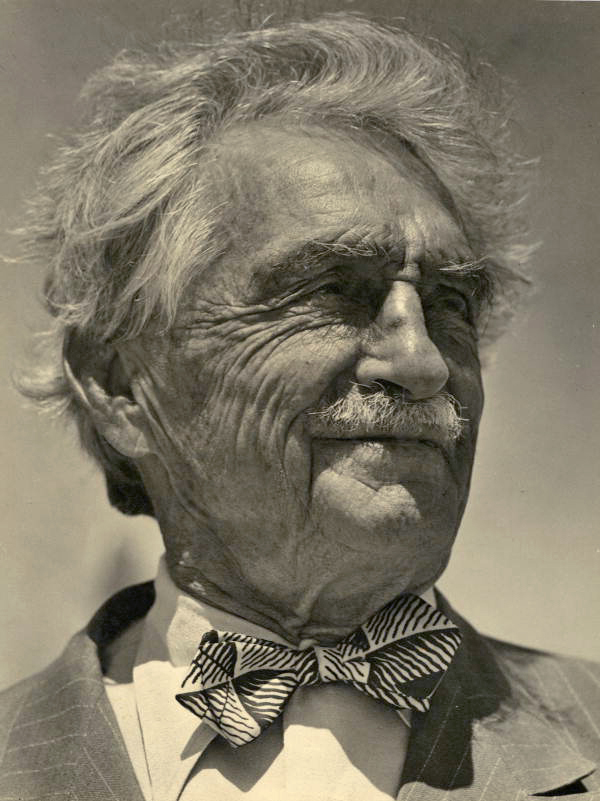
Macfadden in 1948

Macfadden was married four times and had eight children. His son Jack appeared on Groucho Marx's show You Bet Your Life (December 31, 1953) and talked about his father, who was then 84 years old.

He met his third wife, Mary Williamson Macfadden, in England when she won a contest "for the most perfect specimen of England womanhood," sponsored by Macfadden; she was a champion British swimmer. The couple had eight children: Helen, Byrne, Byrnece, Beulah, Beverly, Brewster, Berwyn, and Braunda. Bernarr and Mary separated in 1932, and they divorced in 1946.

Macfadden had ambitions for political office. He sought election as Mayor of New York City, US Senator from Florida, and even US president.

Two of Macfadden's children died for lack of medical care, as Macfadden viewed all doctors as quacks. When one of his daughters died of a heart condition, he remarked, "It's better she's gone; she only would have disgraced me."

=== Death and legacy ===
Macfadden died aged 87 in 1955 after refusing medical treatment for a digestive disorder. He is interred in Woodlawn Cemetery in The Bronx, New York City. Upon his death, Edward Longstreet Bodin became the president of the Bernarr Macfadden Foundation.

== Critical reception ==
Macfadden has drawn criticism for suggesting in his books that readers not consult any professional physician. Macfadden supported unorthodox ideas that are widely derided as quackery, such as grape therapy supposedly healing cancer.

Morris Fishbein wrote that "In his campaign, Bernarr Macfadden aligned himself with the border-line cultists that oppose scientific medicine and devote themselves to the promotion of some single conception of disease causation, prevention, and treatment."

Some of Macfadden's publications also drew criticism for their erotic and sexual content. He was targeted by the Society for the Suppression of Vice for producing "pornographic" posters to promote one of his Physical Culture Exhibitions.

Macfadden's legacy after his death has largely been tarnished by details of his private life. In a 1991 article in Bulletin of the History of Medicine, author James Whorton notes that the glamorous and eccentric character of Macfadden's life has led to a predilection for "the amusing tale or shocking incident" in describing it. Whorton argued that this distracts from Macfadden's real beliefs and significance, causing research to be directed "to the outer person, to actions rather than motives."

== Partial bibliography ==
Macfadden authored or co-authored over 100 books. This is a partial list of titles:

- Physical Training (1900)
- Fasting, Hydropathy, and Exercise (1900, with Felix Leopold Oswald)
- The Virile Powers of Superb Manhood (1900)
- The Power and Beauty of Superb Womanhood (1901)
- Strength from Eating (1901)
- Strong Eyes: How Weak Eyes May be Strengthened and Spectacles Discarded (1901)
- Physical Culture Cook Book (1901, editor; written by Mary Richardson)
- Natural Cure for Rupture. 1902.
- Vaccination Superstition. 1902.
- Marriage: a Lifelong Honeymoon. 1903.
- Building of Vital Power. 1904.
- Creative and Sexual Science. 1904.
- Health, Beauty, and Sexuality. 1904.
- How Success Is Won. 1904.
- A Perfect Beauty. 1904.
- Physical Culture for Babies. 1904.
- A Strenuous Lover. 1904.
- Muscular Power and Beauty. 1906.
- Macfadden Prosecution: A Curious Story of Wrong and Oppression. 1908.
- Vitality Supreme. New York City, Physical Culture Publishing Co. 1915.
- Brain Energy. 1916.
- Manhood and Marriage. New York city, Physical culture publishing co. 1916.
- Womanhood and Marriage. 1918.
- Strengthening the Eyes. 1918.
- Making Old Bodies Young. New York, Physical culture publishing company. 1919.
- Truth About Tobacco. 1921.
- The Miracle of Milk. 1923.
- Fasting for Health. New York, Macfadden publications. 1923.
- Constipation: Its Cause, Effect, and Treatment. New York, Macfadden publications. 1924.
- How to Raise a Strong Baby. 1924.
- Walking Cure, Pep and Power from Walking – How to Cure Disease. 1924.
- Hair Culture. 1921.
- Diabetes: Its Cause, Nature and Treatment. 1925.
- Headaches: How Caused and How Cured. New York, Macfadden publications. 1925.
- Strengthening the Spine. 1925.
- Tooth Troubles. 1925.
- Asthma and Hay Fever. 1926.
- Colds, Coughs, and Catarrh. New York, Macfadden Publications. 1926.
- Foot Troubles. 1926.
- Predetermine Your Baby's Sex. 1926.
- Rheumatism, Its Cause, Nature and Treatment. 1926.
- Skin Troubles. New York, Macfadden publications. 1927.
- Digestive Troubles. 1928.
- Talks to a Young Man About Sex. 1928.
- Tuberculosis. 1929.
- Home Health Manual. 1930.
- After 40 – What?. 1935.
- Practical Birth Control. 1935.
- Woman's Sex Life. 1935.
- How to Gain Weight. 1936.
- How to Reduce Weight. 1936.
- Be Married and Like It. 1937.
- Macfadden's Encyclopedia of Physical Culture. Vol. 1. New York city, Physical culture publishing company. 1920.
- Macfadden's Encyclopedia of Physical Culture. Vol. 2. New York city, Physical culture publishing company. 1920.
- Macfadden's Encyclopedia of Physical Culture. Vol. 3. New York city, Physical culture publishing company. 1920.
- Macfadden's Encyclopedia of Physical Culture. Vol. 4. New York city, Physical culture publishing company. 1920.
- Macfadden's Encyclopedia of Physical Culture. Vol. 5. New York city, Physical culture publishing company. 1920.

== See also ==
- Bates method
