= Sloosh =

Variety of cornbread popular during the American Civil War

- Alternative names: Sloosh Doggies
- Type: Cornbread
- Place of origin: United States
- Main ingredients: Cornmeal and bacon grease

Sloosh was a form of cornbread that was popular during the American Civil War, especially among Confederate soldiers. Civil war historian Shelby Foote described it as a mixture of cornmeal and bacon grease to make a dough, snaked around a ramrod from a rifled musket, and cooked over a campfire.

== See also ==
- List of maize dishes
- Twist Bread
