= Anadama bread =

Yeast bread of United States origin

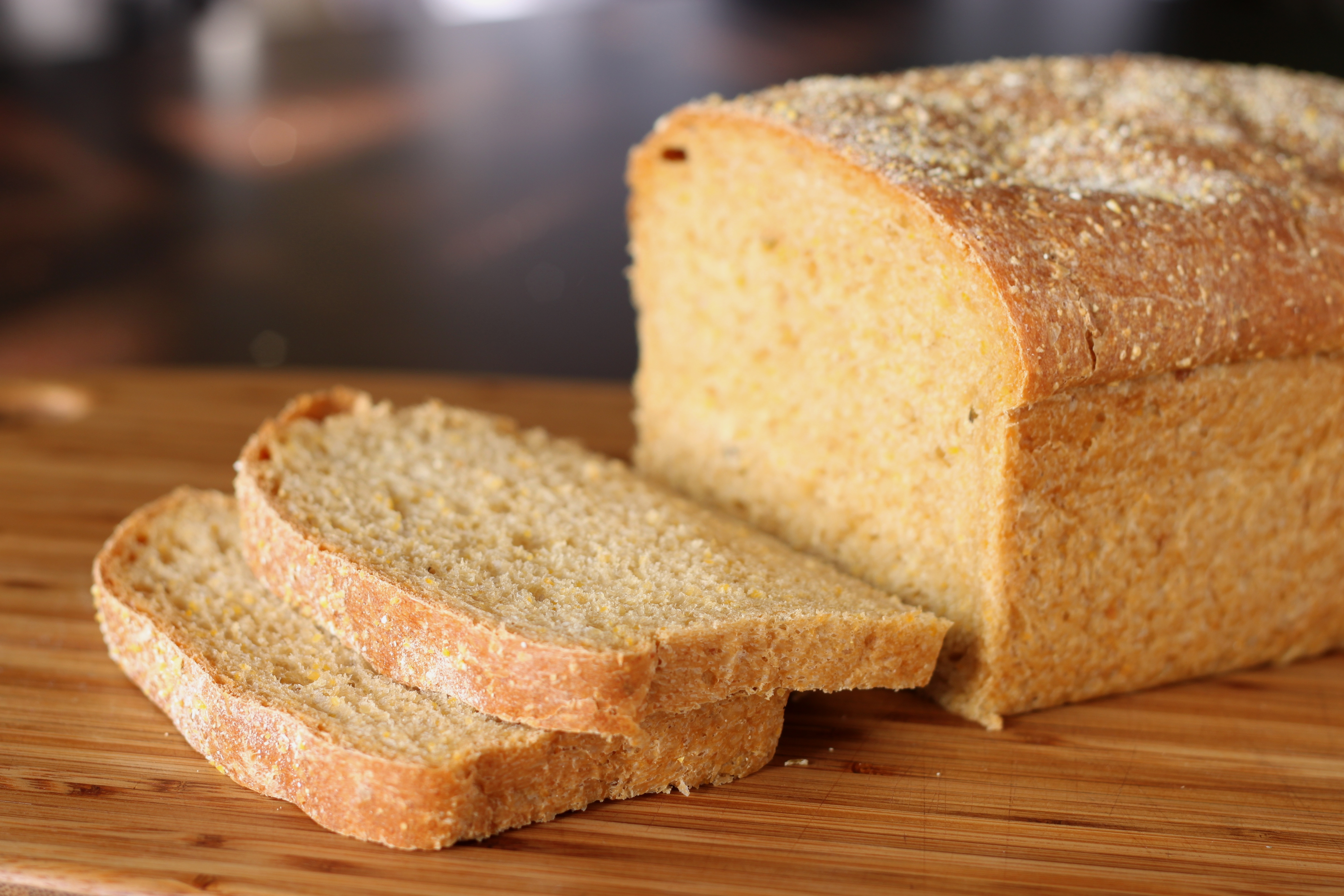
- Type: Bread
- Place of origin: United States
- Region or state: New England
- Main ingredients: Wheat flour (sometimes rye flour), cornmeal, molasses

Anadama bread is a traditional yeast bread of New England in the United States made with wheat flour, cornmeal, molasses and sometimes rye flour.

== Origin ==
Much folklore exists about the origin of the recipe for Anadama bread, and it is not readily agreed upon exactly when or where the bread originated. It is commonly believed to have existed before 1850 in areas of Maine and Massachusetts in coastal New England. The recipe may have been adapted from that of early American brown bread, as described in the 1832 cookbook by Lydia Maria Child, The American Frugal Housewife. It is thought to have come from the local fishing community, but it may have come through the Finnish community of local stonecutters.

A popular folkloric account regarding the origin of the word "Anadama" tells the story of a fisherman becoming tired of meals of corn meal and molasses mush. Upset with his wife, Anna, for serving him nothing else, he one day adds flour and yeast to his porridge, baking the resultant bread, while cursing, "Anna, damn her!"

== Commercial production ==
Near the turn of the 20th century, it was commercially baked by a man called Baker Knowlton of King Street in Rockport, Massachusetts, and delivered in a horse-drawn cart to households by men in blue smocks. In the 1940s, a Rockport restaurant owned by Bill and Melissa Smith called The Blacksmith Shop on Mount Pleasant Street started baking the bread for their restaurant in a small bakery on Main St. They baked about 80 loaves a day until 1956, when they built a modern $250,000 bakery on Pooles Lane. They had 70 employees and 40 trucks which delivered Anadama bread all over New England.

The Anadama bread center of consumption was in Rockport and next-door Gloucester, Massachusetts. It was commercially available from local bakeries widely on Cape Ann from the early 1900s until 1970, when the Anadama Bread Bakery on Pooles Lane in Rockport closed due to Bill Smith's death. For a number of years, it was baked by small local bakeries at breakfast places on Cape Ann.

== See also ==
- List of American breads
- List of regional dishes of the United States
- New England brown bread, a steamed bread made with wheat, rye, cornmeal, and molasses or maple syrup
