= Brown bread =

Whole grain bread

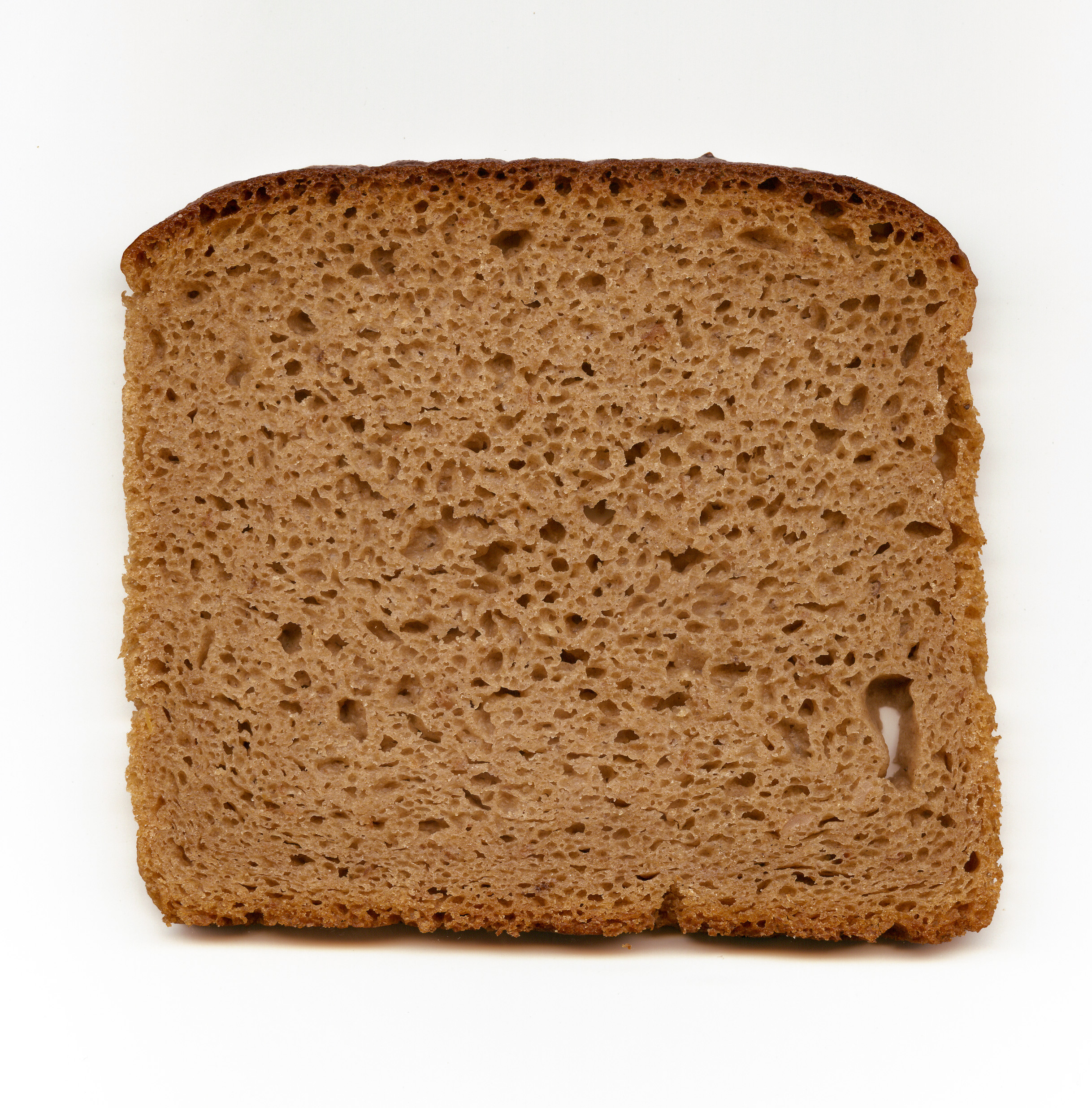
- Type: Bread
- Main ingredients: Whole grain flour (usually rye or wheat) or molasses or coffee
- Food energy (per serving): 260 kcal (1,100 kJ)

Brown bread, in contrast to white bread, is bread made with significant amounts of whole grain flours, usually wheat sometimes with corn and or rye flours. In some countries brown breads often get their characteristic dark color from ingredients such as molasses or coffee. In Canada, the UK, Ireland and South Africa, it is a blend of white flour and whole wheat flour. Wholemeal bread within the UK must be made solely from whole wheat flour. In New England and the Maritimes, brown bread is bread sweetened with molasses.

== History ==
In Ireland, during the Famine, prior to 1848, brown bread was handed out to the poor. In England, brown bread was made from brown meal. Around and prior to the year 1845, brown meal was considered a less desirable grain product, and was priced accordingly. However, by 1865, due to recently discovered health benefits of bran, brown meal's London price had increased to a point often greater than that of fine flour.

=== Flour milling ===
Historically, brown meal was what remained after about 90% of the coarse, outer bran and 74% of pure endosperm or fine flour was removed from the whole grain. Using slightly different extraction numbers, brown meal, representing 20% of the whole grain, was itself composed of about 15% fine bran and 85% white flour. In 1848 it was asserted grain millers knew only of bran and endosperm, but by 1912 it was more widely known that brown meal included the germ.

=== Color ===
The brown color of whole grain breads is caused by cerealine, a discovery attributed to Hippolyte Mège-Mouriès of France. Cerealine, considered by Mouriès an active principal or ferment similar in action to diastase, came from the cereal layer of rectangular cells that millers considered a part of bran, later sometimes called the aleurone layer. In a statement attributed to Mouriès, if the cerealine is neutralized, white bread can be made from bran-containing flour.

== Varieties ==
=== Irish ===
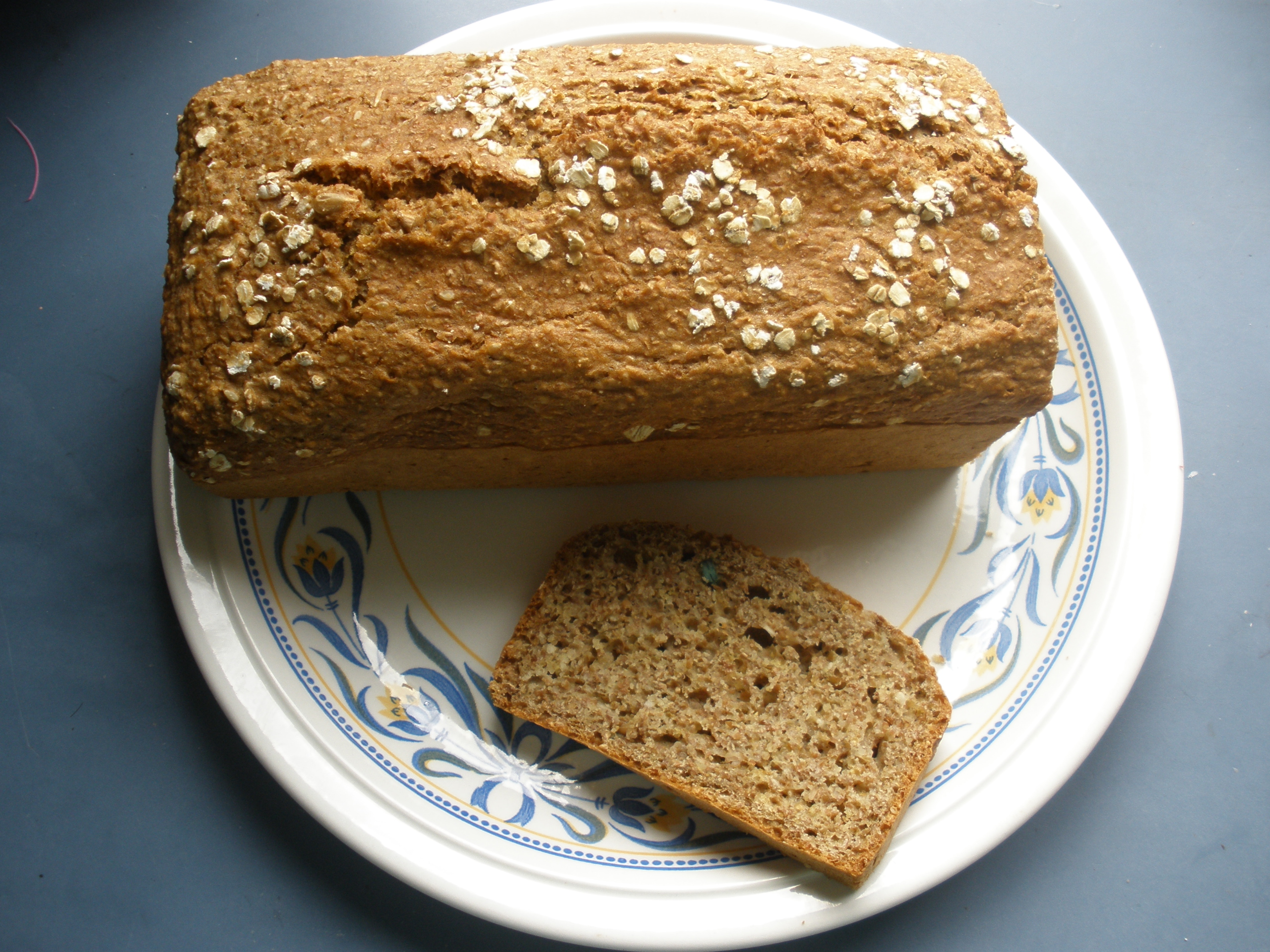
Homemade Irish soda bread

Irish wheaten bread is a form of Irish soda bread made with whole-wheat flour.

=== Borodinsky ===
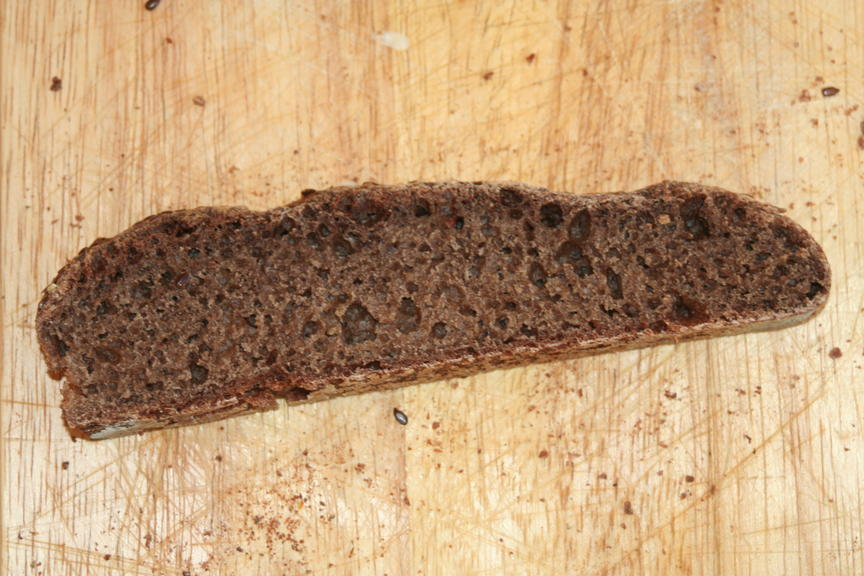
Chocolate-coloured sourdough bread

Borodinsky bread is a slightly sweet sourdough rye bread of Russian origin, usually flavoured by caraway and coriander seeds and sweetened with molasses, which augments its already quite dark colour coming from the rye flour. It is named after the Battle of Borodino, and the legend says that it was invented by the widow of one of the Russian generals who died in that battle, though in reality it was probably created much later, at the end of the 19th century.

=== Boston ===
New England or Boston brown bread is a type of dark, slightly sweet multigrain steamed bread, usually sweetened with molasses. It is popular in New England and traditionally served with baked beans and hot dogs.

Boston brown bread's colour comes from a mixture of flours, usually a mix of cornmeal, rye, whole wheat, or graham flour, and from the addition of sweeteners like molasses and maple syrup. Raisins are sometimes added. The batter is poured into a can and steamed in a kettle.

== Loaf volume ==
Whole wheat flours that contain raw wheat germ instead of toasted germ have higher levels of glutathione, resulting in lower loaf volumes.

== Gallery ==
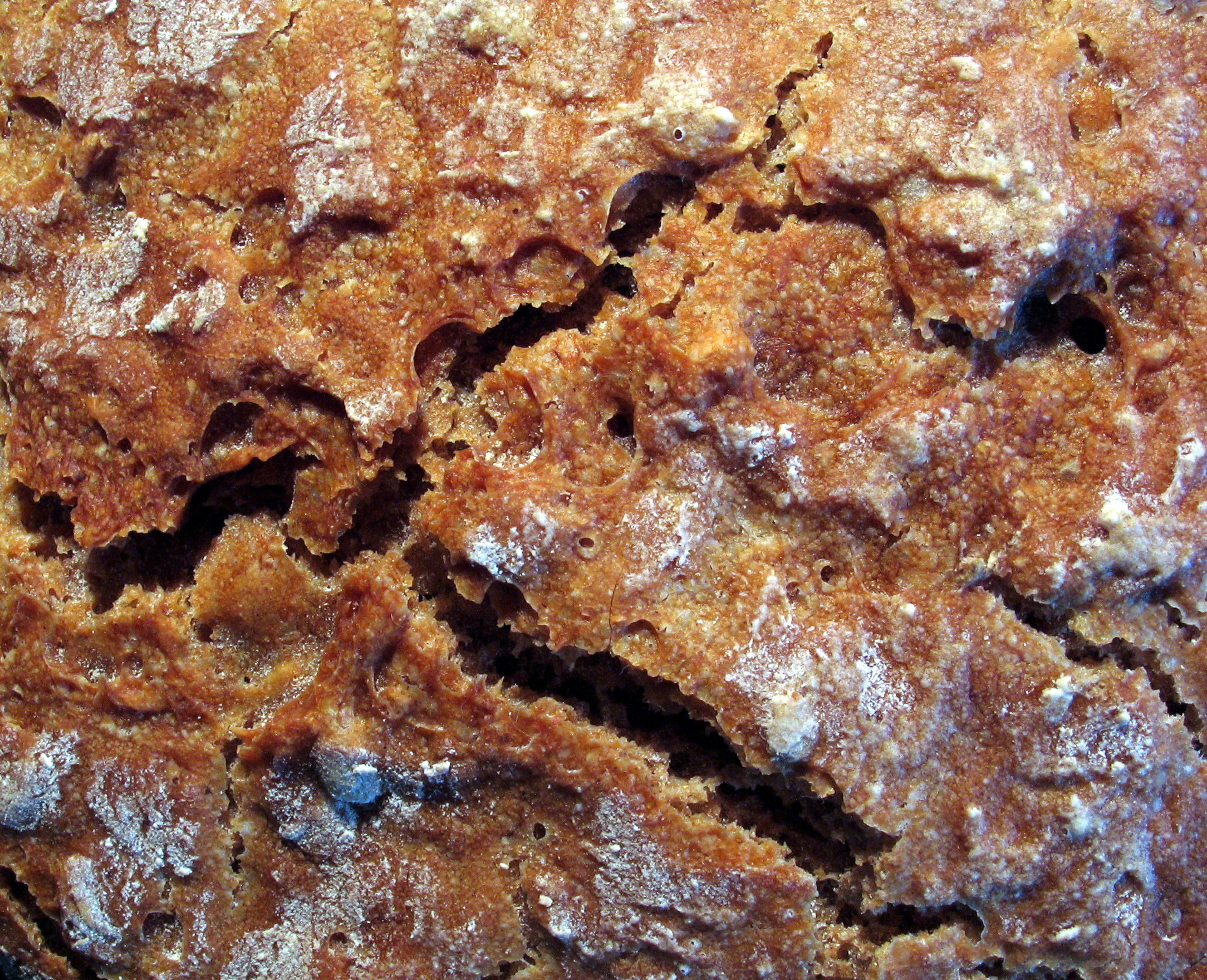
Crust of a loaf of brown bread

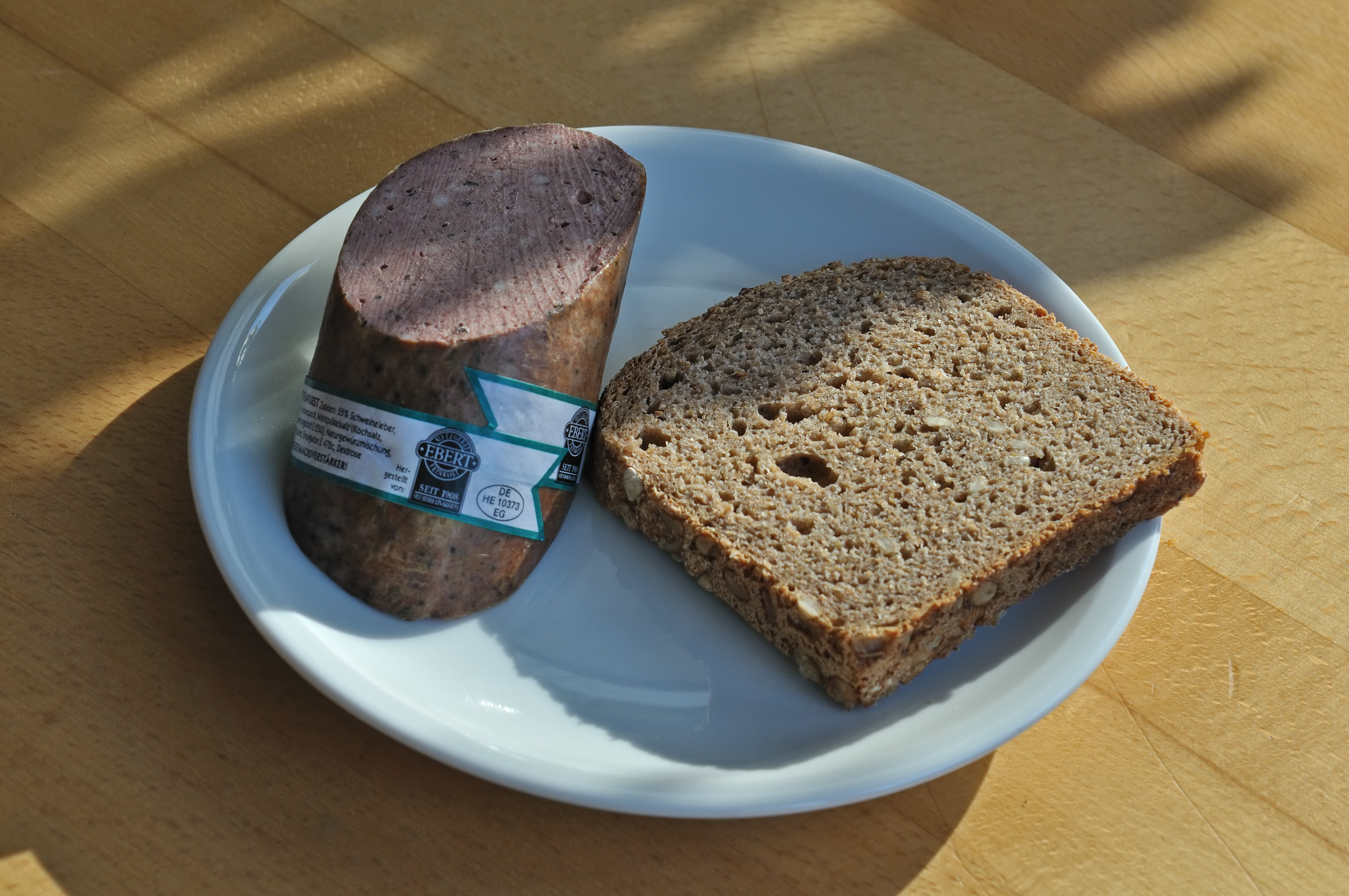
Frankfurter Zeppelinwurst with brown bread

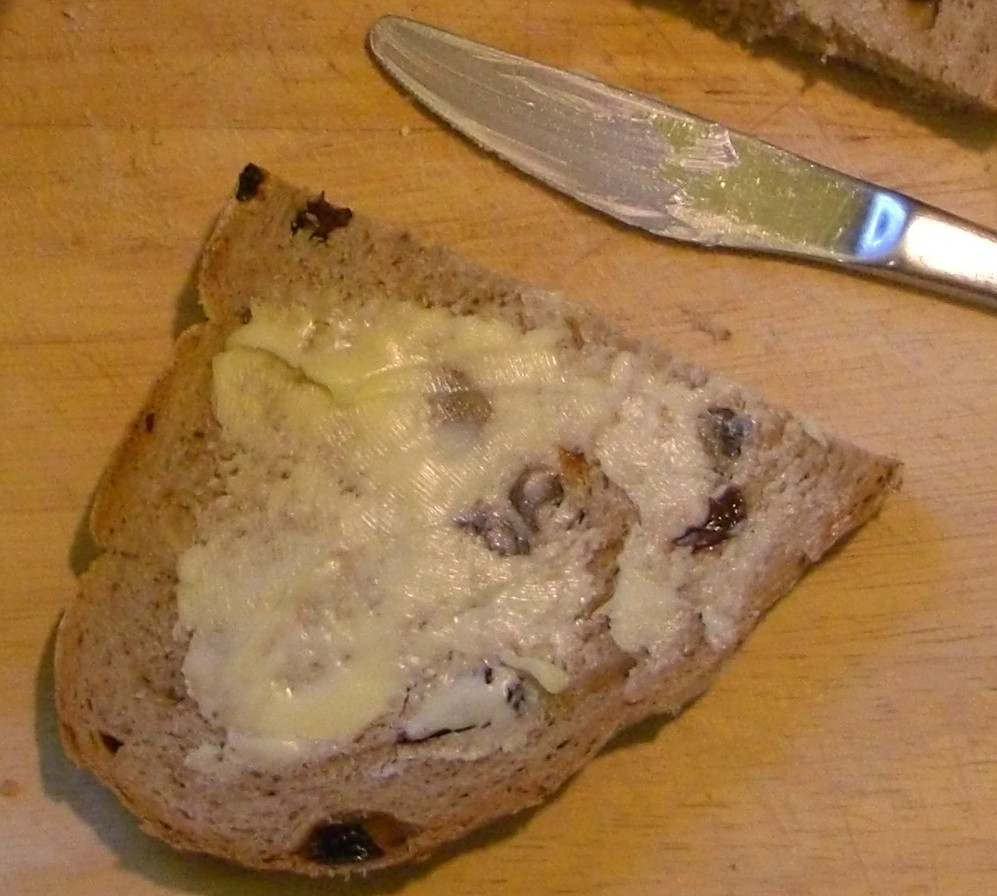
Buttered walnut and raisin brown bread

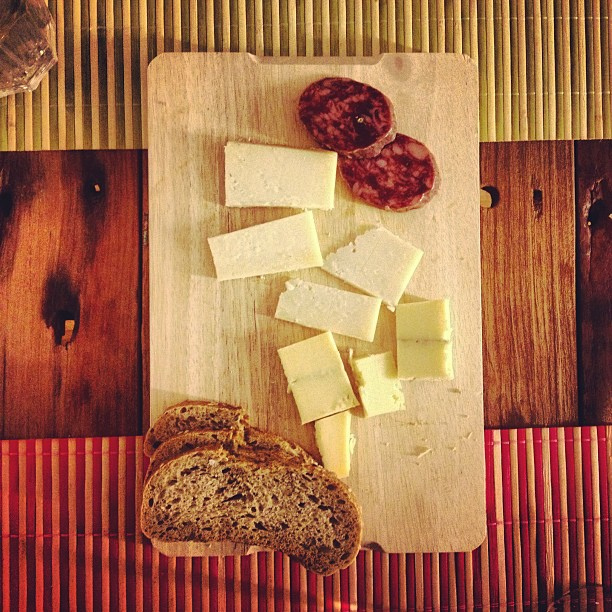
Brown bread served with cheese and sausage

== See also ==
- Anadama bread, a yeast bread of New England made with wheat, cornmeal, molasses, tan to brown in colour
- Graham bread
- List of breads
- Malt loaf
- Pumpernickel, a dark brown bread of Germany
- Whole wheat bread
