= Sops of Wine =

Apple cultivar

'Sops of Wine' or 'Sops in Wine'
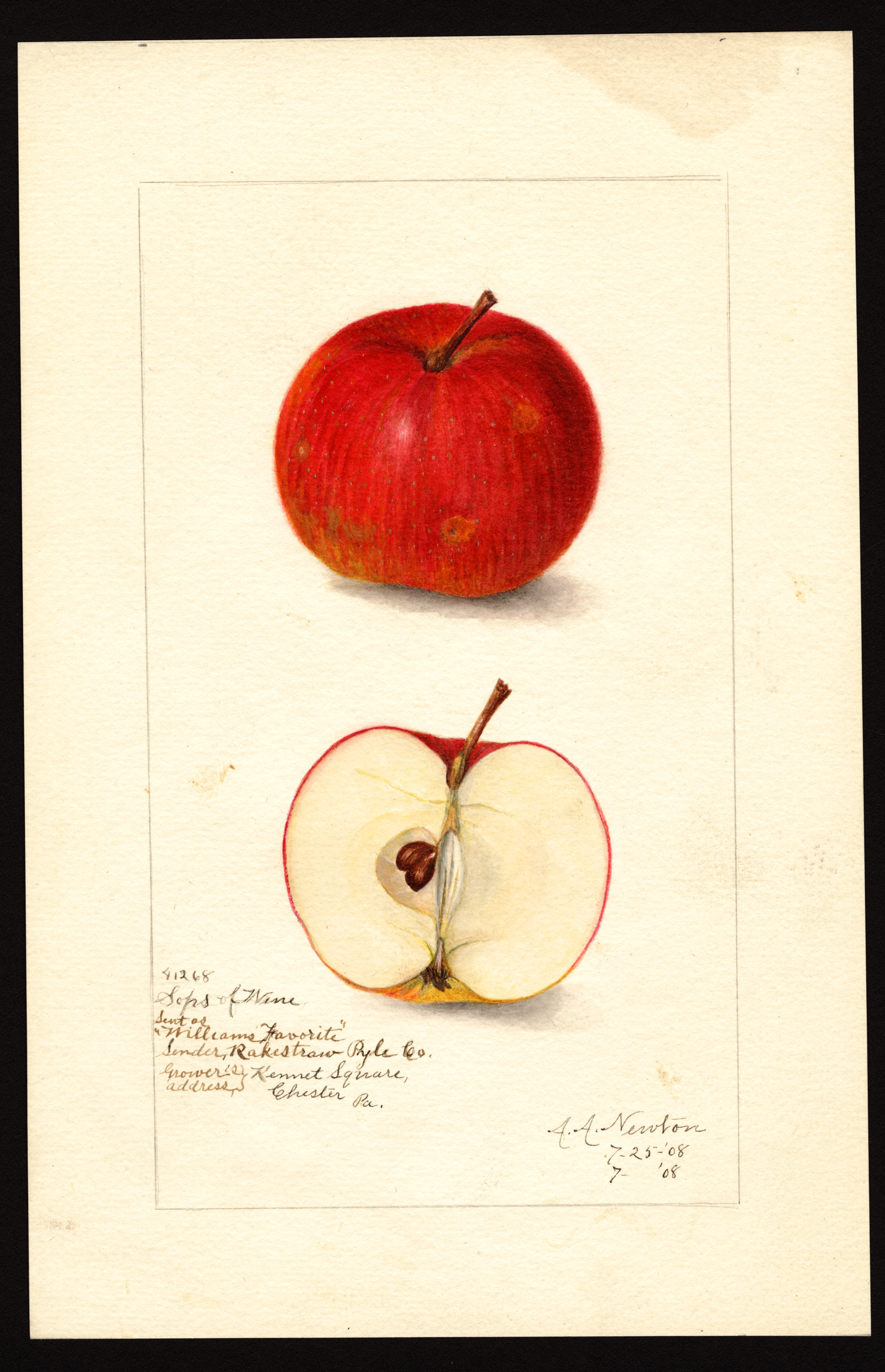
- Species: Malus domestica

'Sops of Wine' refers to two similar old English apple cultivars that have flesh stained with dark red, looking like bread soaked in wine. One of them is also known as 'Rode Wyn Appel' and 'Sapson'. They have also been known as 'Shropshirevine', 'Strawberry', and 'Washington'.
