= Thanksgiving dinner =

Centerpiece of Thanksgiving in the US and Canada

Thanksgiving meal
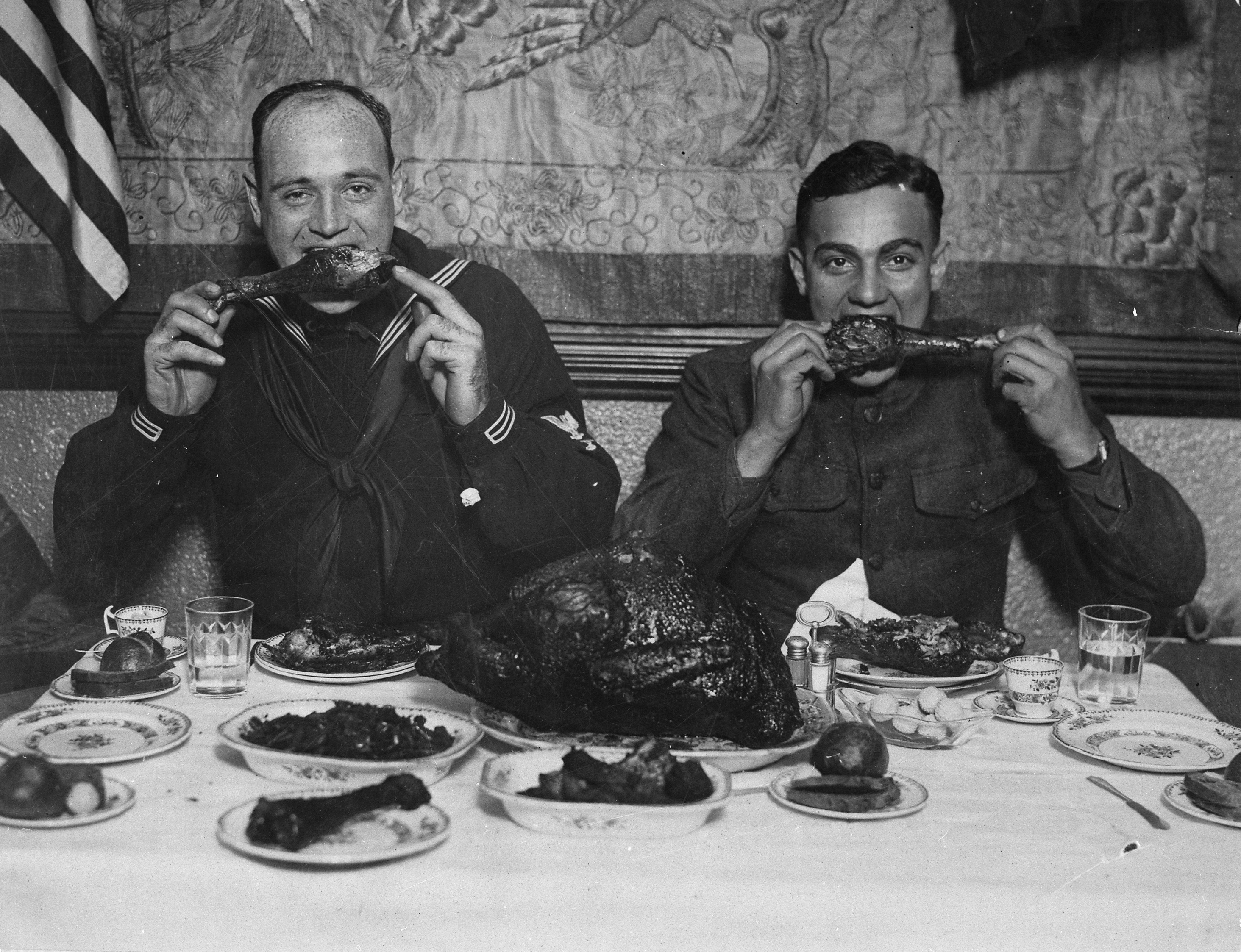
- Servicemen in 1918 having a Thanksgiving dinner
- Type: Cultural, Western
- Frequency: Annual

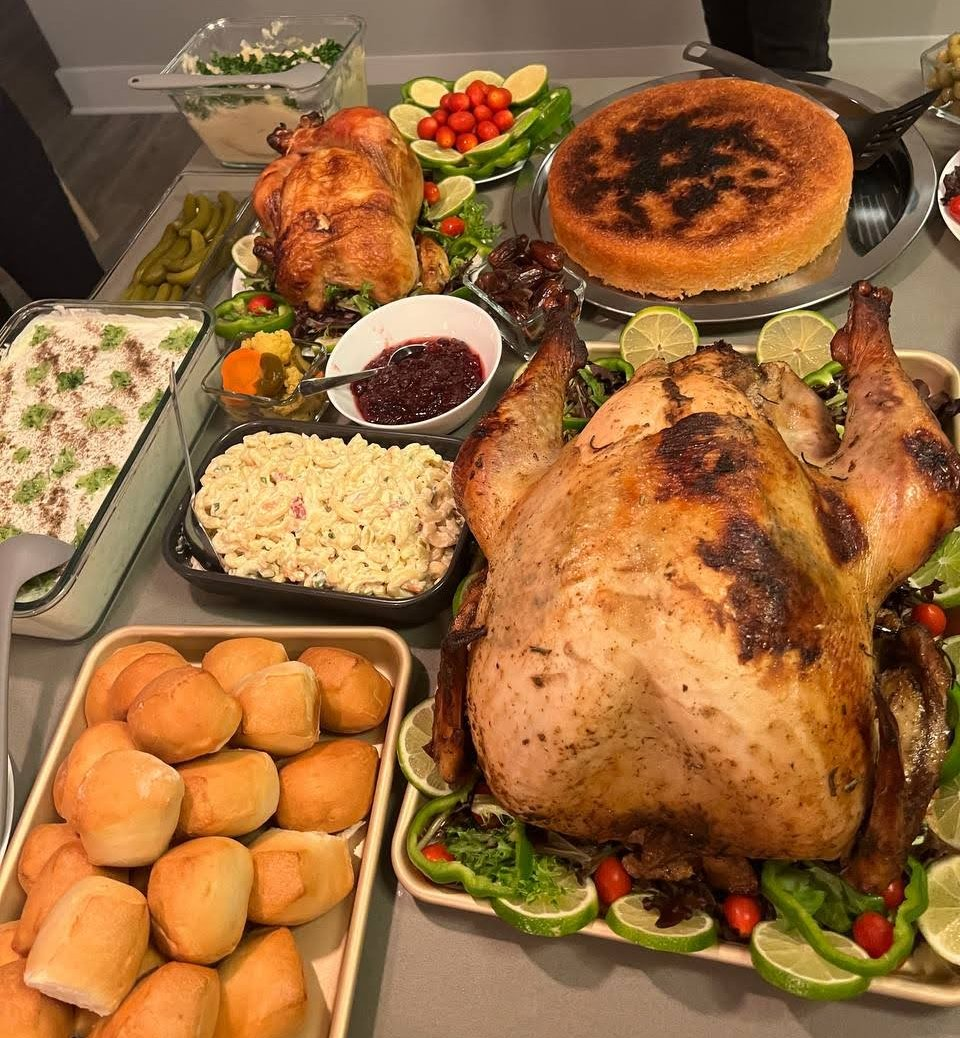
A thanksgiving dinner

The centerpiece of contemporary Thanksgiving in the United States and Canada is Thanksgiving dinner, a large meal generally centered on a large roasted turkey. Thanksgiving is the largest eating event in the United States as measured by retail sales of food and beverages and by estimates of individual food intake. In a 2015 Harris Poll, Thanksgiving was the second most popular holiday in the United States (after Christmas), and turkey was the most popular holiday food, regardless of region, generation, gender, or race.

Along with attending church services, Thanksgiving dinner remained a central part of celebrations from the holiday's early establishment in North America. Given that days of thanksgiving revolve around giving thanks, the saying of grace before Thanksgiving dinner is a traditional feature of the feast. At Thanksgiving dinner, turkey is served with a variety of side dishes that can vary from traditional to ones that reflect regional or cultural heritage.

Many of the dishes in a traditional Thanksgiving dinner are made from ingredients native to the Americas, including the turkey bird, potato, sweet potato, corn (maize), squash (including pumpkin), green bean, and cranberry. The Pilgrims may have learned about some of these foods from Native Americans, but others were not available to the early settlers. The tradition of eating them at Thanksgiving likely reflects their affordability for later Americans. Early North American settlers did eat wild turkey, but the lavish feasts that are frequently ascribed to Thanksgiving in the 17th century were a creation of nineteenth-century writers who sought to popularize a unifying holiday in which all Americans could share.

Thanksgiving Day was made a national holiday in the mid-19th century, and the importance of the day and its centerpiece family meal has become a widely observed American and Canadian tradition, with the meal consisting of roast turkey (or substitute) and many sides being central part of the holiday. It has seen adoption in other English speaking realms such as the United Kingdom, where a broader repertoire of American cuisine is often served. The first frozen TV dinner was a Thanksgiving dinner triggered by a glut of turkeys in the year 1953.

== Plymouth Colony and Thanksgiving dinner ==
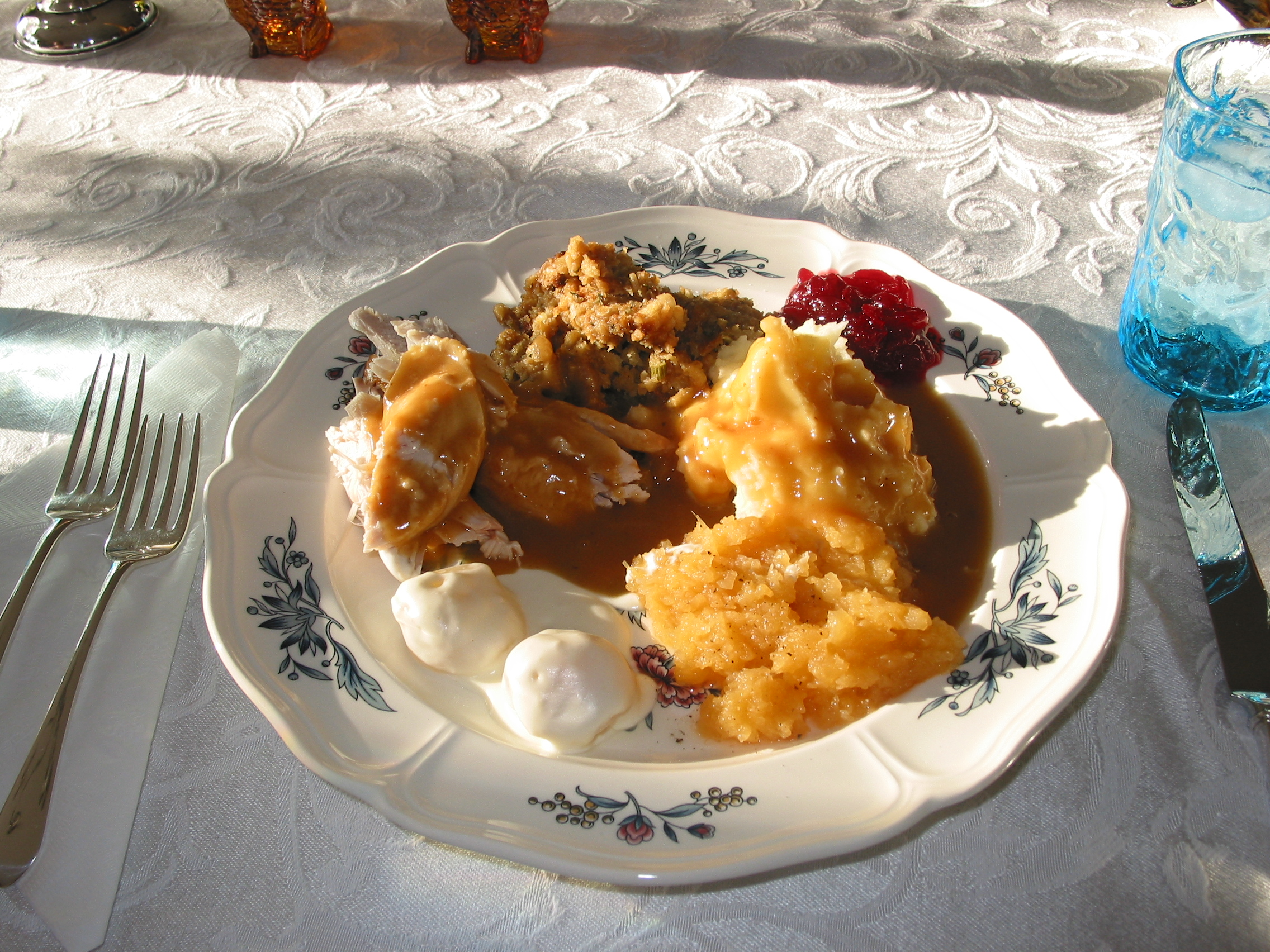
Thanksgiving dinner plate in Maine. Each region and plate has its own variations, but a sauce covered main meat with many sides is typical.

The tradition of Thanksgiving dinner has often been associated in popular culture with New England. New England Puritans proclaimed days of thanksgiving to commemorate many specific events. Such days were marked by religious observances, prayer, and sometimes fasting. Church records of the time do not mention food or feasting as being part of such events. A single exception records that following church services in 1636, there was "then making merry to the creatures, the poorer sort being invited of the richer."

On December 11, 1621, Governor Edward Winslow of the Plymouth Colony wrote a letter in hopes of attracting more colonists. In it, he described a three-day feast shared by the Plymouth settlers and the local Wampanoag tribe. Winslow sent out four men who provided a variety of fowls, sufficient to feed the colony for a week, while Massasoit's hunters killed five deer. In the 19th century, this event became associated with the idea of a Thanksgiving feast. In a footnote in 1841, Alexander Young claimed that this event "was the first thanksgiving, the harvest festival of New England". Jamestown, Virginia, and other locations have also been suggested as sites of the "First Thanksgiving".

Most of what was served, however, according to some historians, as referenced in a letter from Edward Winslow written on 11 December 1621, would have been seafood, including lobster, fish, eels, mussels and oysters. Mussels in particular were abundant in New England and could be easily harvested because they clung to rocks along the shoreline. Oysters would remain part of Thanksgiving dinners until the 1950s.

One of the most persistent advocates for Thanksgiving as a national holiday was writer Sarah Josepha Hale. Although she advocated for Thanksgiving in editorials in Godey's Lady's Book from 1837 onwards, Hale did not associate the Pilgrims with Thanksgiving until a brief mention in 1865. In "America's Thanksgiving Hymn", published in 1872, she credited the Pilgrims as being "free to do and pray, And keep in sober gladness Their first Thanksgiving Day". Hale did not suggest that the Pilgrim thanksgiving included feasting.

Other writers were less discerning. Jane G. Austin published a fictional account of the Pilgrims, Standish of Standish, in 1889. Austin described the Pilgrims a year after their arrival as feasting on turkey stuffed with beechnuts, other types of fowl, venison, boiled beef and other roasts, oysters, clam chowder, plum-porridge, hasty pudding, sea biscuit, manchet bread, butter, treacle, mustard, turnips, salad, grapes, plums, popcorn, ale, and root beer. Austin's lavish description disregarded the historical record and the deaths due to starvation and malnutrition that occurred in the Plymouth Colony that winter. Nonetheless, her account was extremely popular. It was repeated by other writers, adapted for plays and public events, and adopted by school curricula. The writings of Austin and others helped to establish the inaccurate image of the Pilgrim Thanksgiving feast in popular culture and make it a part of the national identity of the United States.

== Historical menus ==
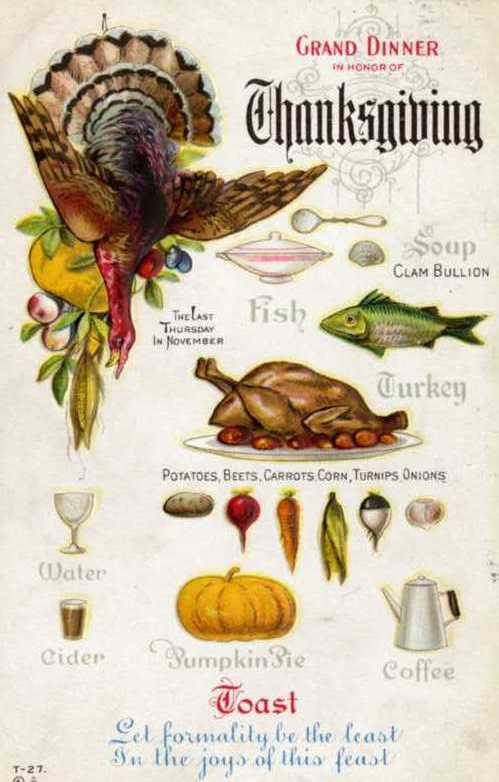
Postcard describing 'A Grand Dinner in Honor of Thanksgiving'

The use of roasted turkey in the United States for Thanksgiving precedes Abraham Lincoln's nationalization of the holiday in 1863. In her 1827 novel Northwood; or, a Tale of New England, Sarah Josepha Hale devoted an entire chapter to Thanksgiving dinner, emphasizing many of the foods that are now considered traditional. Although many other meats are mentioned, "the roasted turkey took precedence on this occasion, being placed at the head of the table; and well did it become its lordly stations, sending forth the rich odour of its savoury stuffing". The tradition of eating Turkey on Thanksgiving dates back to its role as an easily accessible and practical food source during early harvest celebrations. For dessert, "the celebrated pumpkin pie...occupied the most distinguished niche" and was described as "an indispensable part of a good and true Yankee Thanksgiving".

The White House Cook Book, published in 1887 by Fanny Lemira Gillette, had the following menu: oysters on half shell, cream of chicken soup, fried smelts, sauce tartare, roast turkey, cranberry sauce, mashed potatoes, baked squash, boiled onions, parsnip fritters, olives, chicken salad, venison pastry, pumpkin pie, mince pie, charlotte russe, almond ice cream, lemon jelly, hickory nut cake, cheese, fruits, and coffee.

A Thanksgiving Day dinner served to the Civilian Conservation Corps in 1935 included pickles, green olives, celery, roast turkey, oyster stew, cranberry sauce, giblet gravy, dressing, creamed asparagus tips, snowflake potatoes, baked carrots, hot rolls, fruit salad, mince pie, fruitcake, candies, grapes, apples, clams, fish, and many other foods, along with French drip coffee, cigars, and cigarettes.

Sugar, among other food commodities, was rationed from 1942 to 1946. In 1947, as part of a voluntary rationing campaign, the Truman administration attempted to promote "Poultryless Thursdays", discouraging Americans from eating poultry or egg products on Thursdays. Because Thanksgiving is always on a Thursday, this meant that turkey and pumpkin pie, two Thanksgiving staples, would be discouraged (pumpkin pie because it contains eggs). The National Poultry and Egg Board furiously lobbied the President to cease promoting the plan, culminating in an agreement at the National Thanksgiving Turkey Presentation shortly before Thanksgiving in 1947. Turkey was no longer discouraged, but Eggless Thursdays remained for the rest of the year, meaning no pumpkin pie was served at the White House dinner that year.

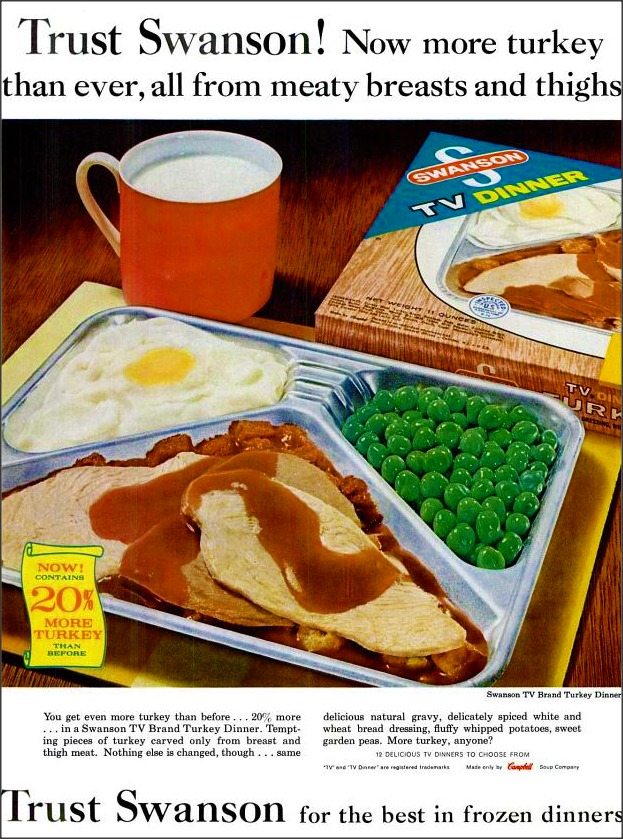
Surplus turkeys from Thanksgiving in 1953 led to the creation of pre-made frozen thanksgiving turkey dinners (the first frozen TV dinners popularized in the 50s and 60s)

Thanksgiving dinner is tied to the genesis of the first TV Dinner/Frozen dinner in the 1950s: In 1953, the company Swanson had hundreds of tons of turkey left over after thanksgiving due to an overestimation of demand. The solution came by harnessing a frozen meat technology that had been in development since the 1920s, and the proposal was to use the leftover turkeys in a pre-made frozen thanksgiving dinner. The meal was frozen with the food in a partitioned aluminum tray that could then be re-heated, and the meal would have Turkey with gravy, stuffing, mashed potatoes, and peas. The product skyrocketed in popularity and capitalized on the rise of television; fast preparation meant families could eat by the television more easily and this became a social trend in the United States. The dinners were not simply frozen, but used a flash freezing technology that prevents the formation of ice crystals that alter the texture of meat. Flash freezing was developed in the 1920s, inspired by observations of Inuit throwing fish on ice, and used in preservation of airline food before its use by Swanson.

== Main dishes ==
=== Turkey ===
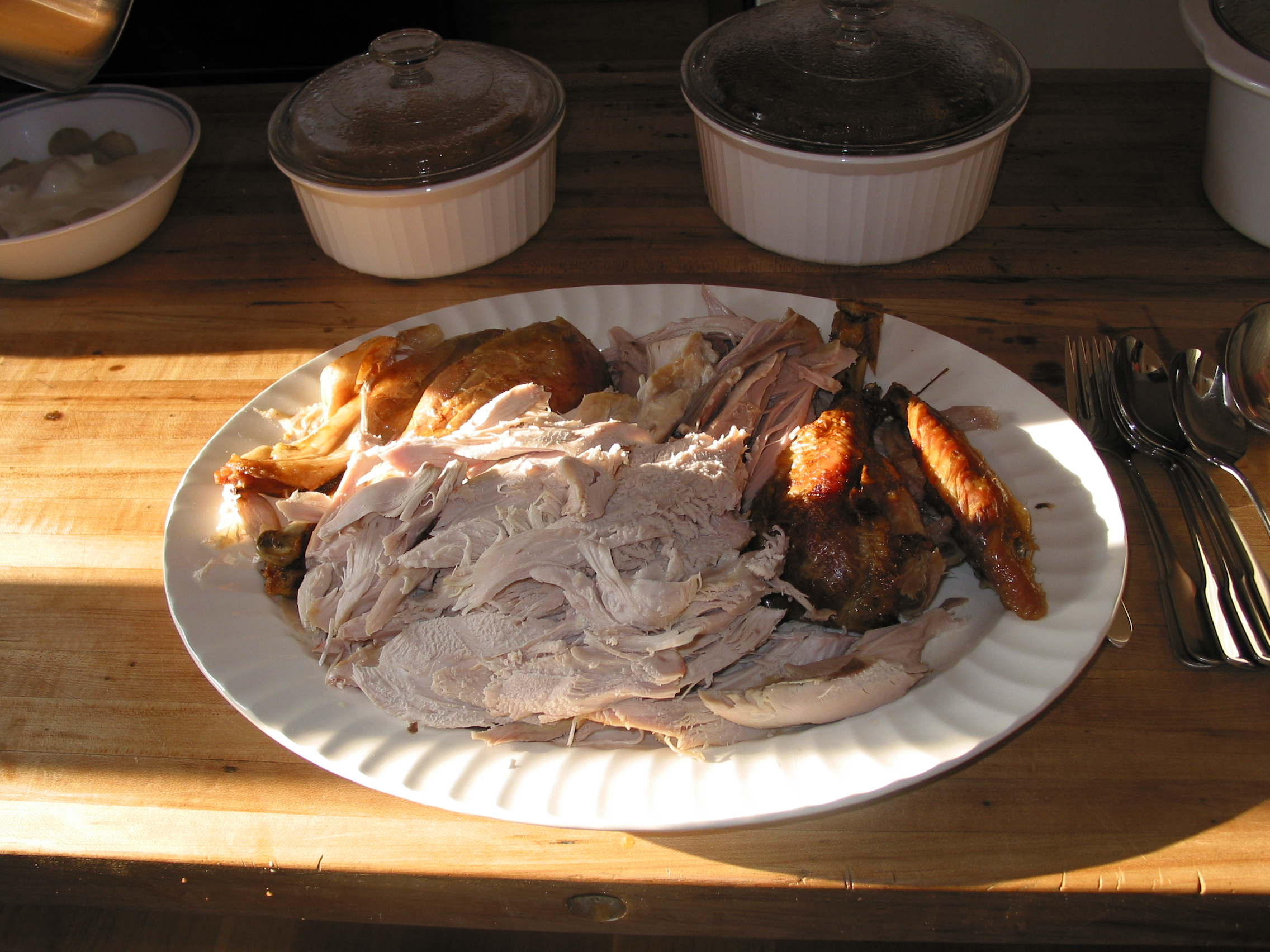
Carved turkey plate

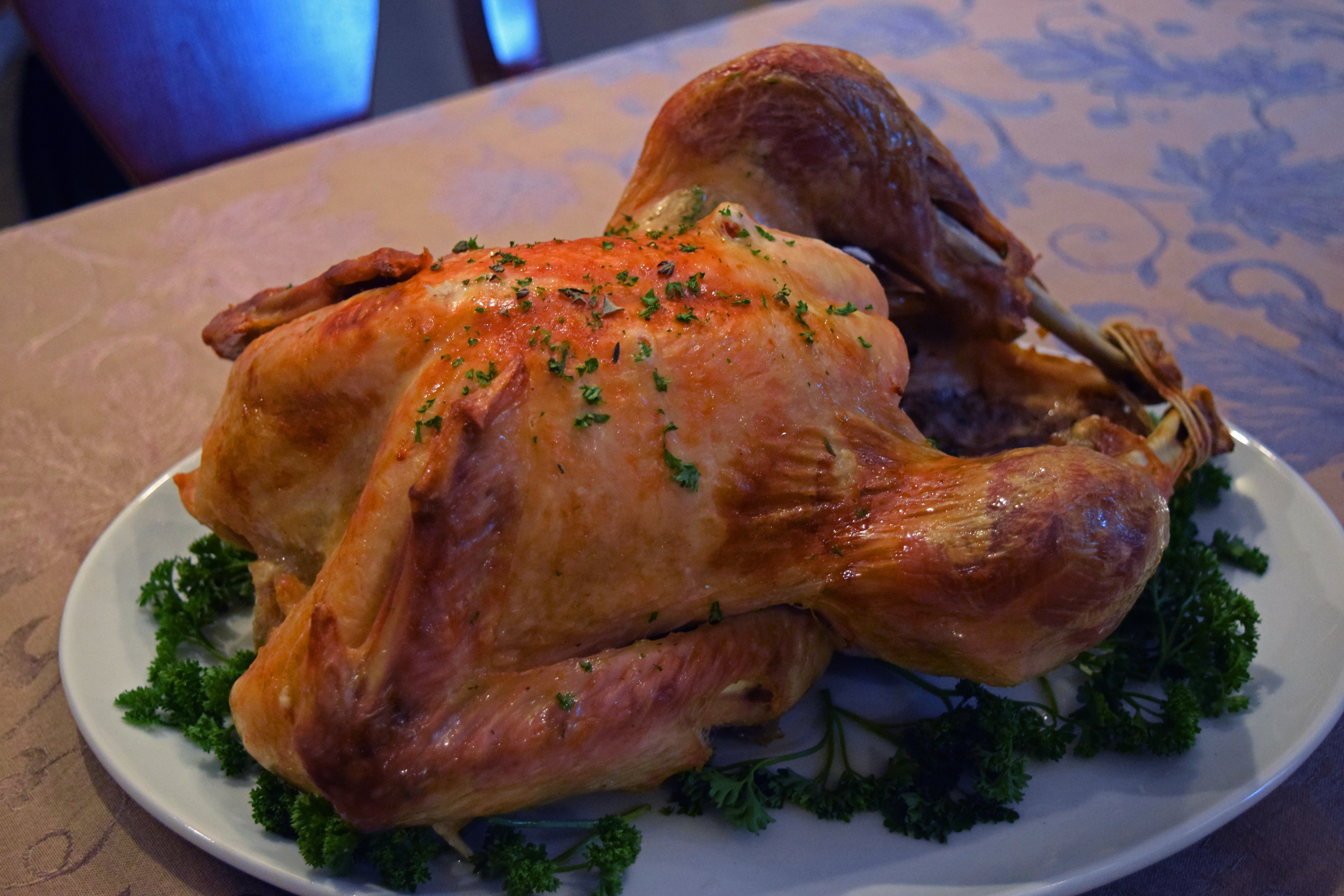
Roast turkey for Thanksgiving

Turkey is the most common main dish of a Thanksgiving dinner, to the point that Thanksgiving is sometimes colloquially called "Turkey Day". In fact, $983 million has been spent on turkeys alone in 2024. Alexander Hamilton proclaimed that "no citizen of the United States should refrain from turkey on Thanksgiving Day", and Benjamin Franklin had high regard for the wild turkey as an American icon. As Thanksgiving Day rose in popularity during the 1800s, so too did the turkey. By 1857, turkey had become part of the traditional dinner in New England.

The domestic turkey eaten now is very different from the wild turkey known to the Pilgrims, Hamilton, and Franklin. Wild turkeys are native to the Americas and evolved around 5 million years ago. At least five subspecies are still found in 48 states, Mexico, and Canada. Today, the southern Mexico subspecies Meleagris gallopavo gallopavo is almost extinct, but in the early 16th century it was taken to Europe from Mexico by the Spanish. Its descendants later returned to America. Twentieth century commercial varieties of turkey were bred from these European descendants.

The Beltsville Small White turkey was bred by the USDA at the Beltsville Agricultural Research Center in Maryland in response to consumer demand for a small (8-15 pound) turkey with more white meat and no dark feathers. It was introduced commercially in 1947 and dominated the market for nearly 20 years. The Small White was supplanted by the Broad Breasted White turkey, bred specifically for large feasts such as Thanksgiving. These turkeys can grow to over 40 pounds, but the breed must be artificially bred and suffers from health problems due to its size. It is estimated that more than 99% of the American turkeys eaten are Broad Breasted Whites. In 2006, American turkey growers were expected to raise 270 million turkeys, to be processed into five billion pounds of turkey meat valued at almost $8 billion, with one third of all turkey consumption occurring in the Thanksgiving-Christmas season (and a fifth of the overall total coming from Thanksgiving alone), and a per capita consumption of almost 18 pounds (8.2 kg).

Thanksgiving turkey is sometimes stuffed with a traditional savory bread pudding and roasted. Sage is the standard herb added to the stuffing, along with chopped onions and celery. Other ingredients, such as chopped chestnuts or other tree nuts, crumbled sausage or bacon, carrots, cranberries, raisins, and/or apples, may be added to stuffing. If the mixture is cooked outside the bird, a stock is generally added to prevent it from drying out. A number of cultural and regional factors affect whether this is referred to as "stuffing" or "dressing".

Turkeys prepared as the main course of a Thanksgiving meal are traditionally roasted, though certain cooks and regional preferences may feature a bird that has been grilled, smoked, or which has had its individual cuts braised, or sous vide. In recent years, the popularity of deep-fried turkey has grown substantially, owing to its shorter preparation time and production of a bird with moist interior meat and a crispy exterior skin. Despite its popularity, this method also carries higher safety risks than others.

The consumption of turkey on Thanksgiving is so ingrained in American culture that each year since 1947, the National Turkey Federation (and, as far back as 1873, commercial turkey farmers) has presented a live turkey to the president of the United States prior to each Thanksgiving. These turkeys were initially slaughtered and eaten for the president's Thanksgiving dinner; since 1989, the presented turkeys have typically been given a mock pardon to great fanfare and sent to a park to live out the rest of their usually short natural lives. However the first "pardon" to a turkey was given by President Abraham Lincoln in 1863, and there is a monument in Hartford, Connecticut, to this one; this story may be aprocyphal, as it first appeared in print two years after it allegedly happened, after Lincoln had been assassinated.

==== Giblet gravy ====
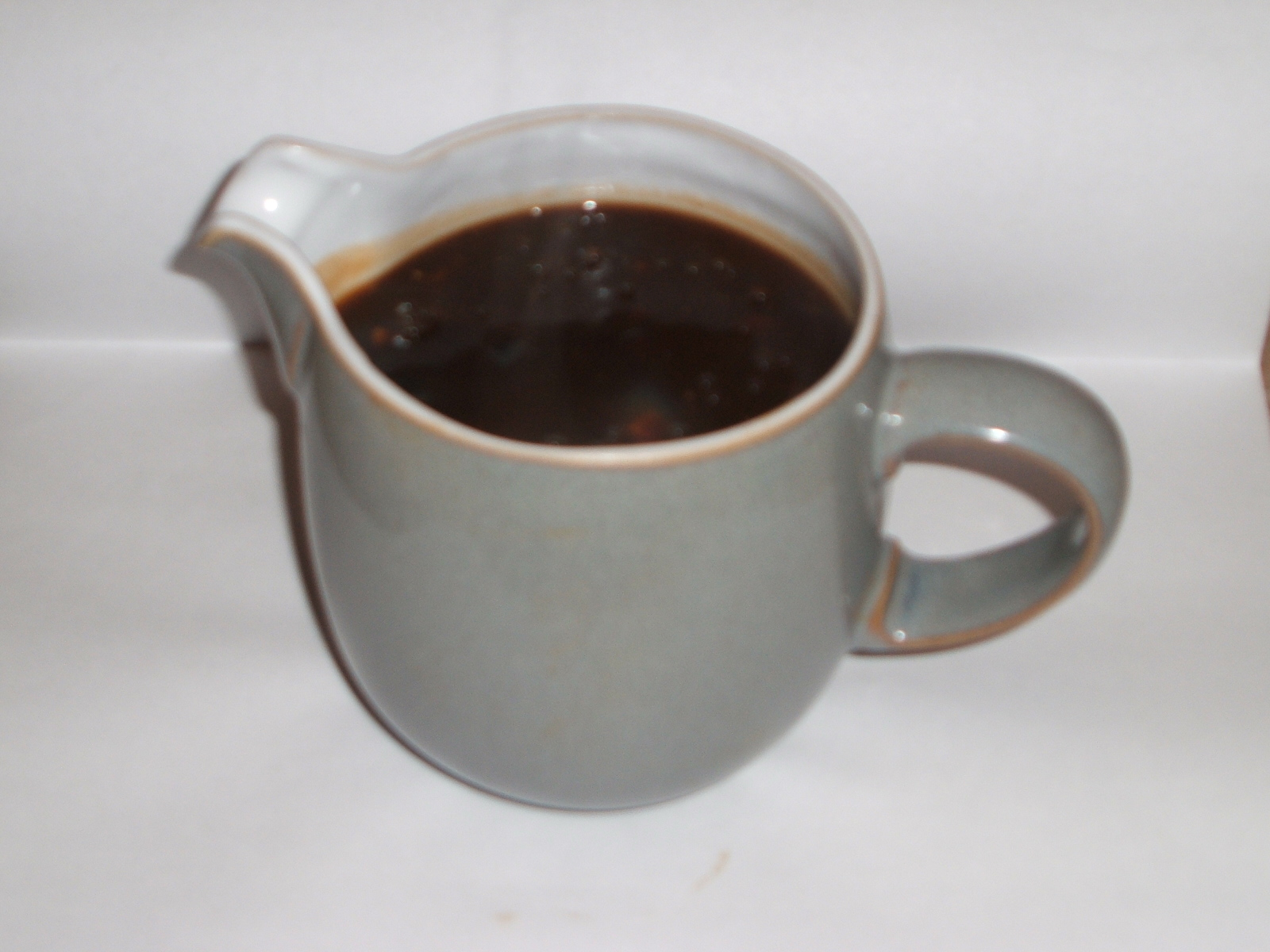
Gravy is poured from a gravy boat over the turkey and mashed potatoes, etc. An alternative is to ladle it from a bowl

A traditional side called giblet gravy can be made from the turkey. The giblet is not a specific bird organ, but several that are traditional for the butcher to include in a small bag of turkey parts like the liver, kidney, gizzard, heart, and neck. These can be cooked to create the gravy for a meal. The gravy can also be made using chicken broth and other ingredients as a base, or from the actual turkey, but not from the giblet. The gravy can be prepared in advance, then reheated on the day. In addition to the turkey giblet, drippings from cooking the turkey can be an ingredient, both of which have a turkey flavor. Thanksgiving gravy is usually a balance of being "thick but pourable" with silky texture and complex flavor. The giblet can also be used to make a stock or as part of the stuffing.

=== Alternatives to turkey ===
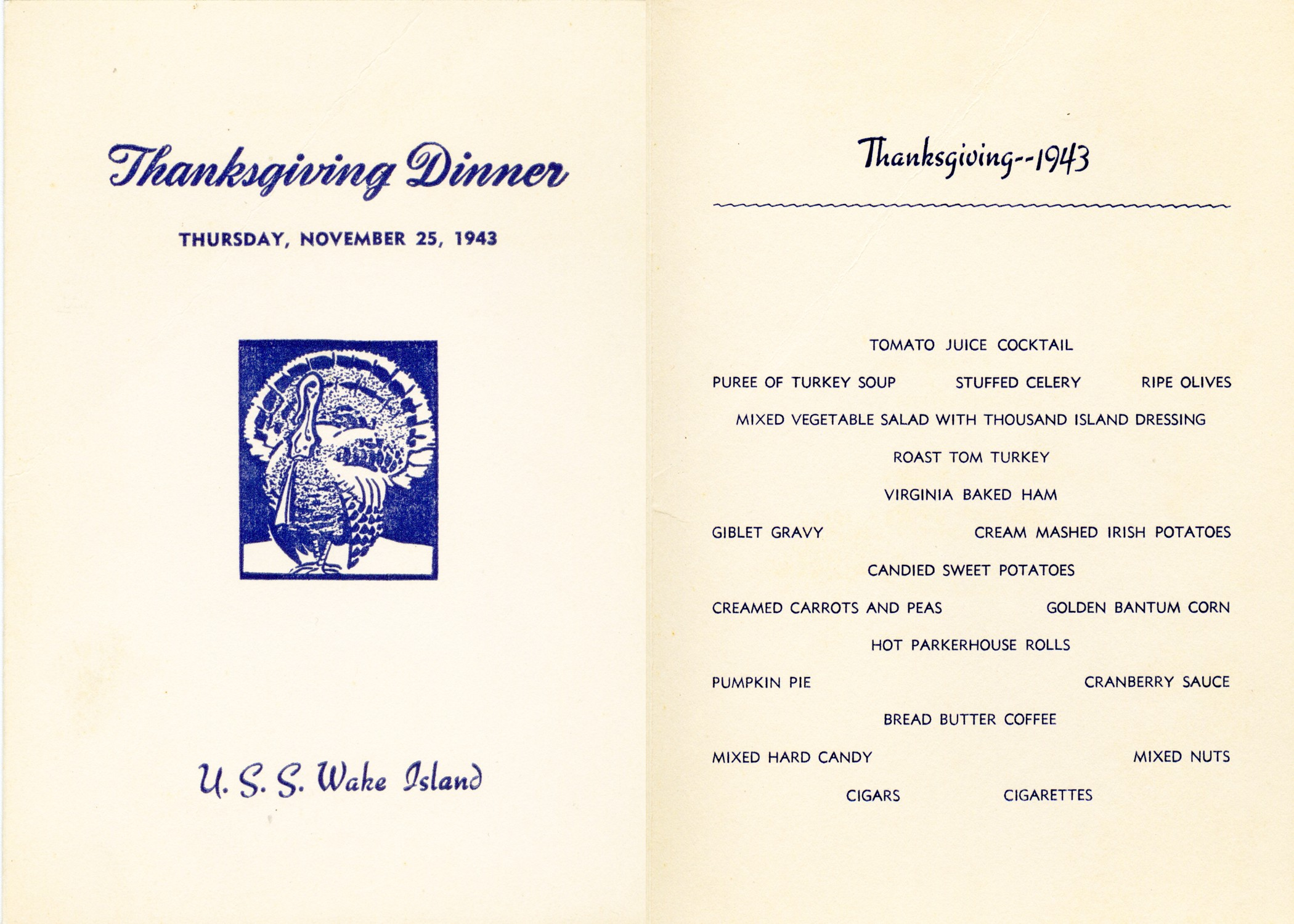
1943 Thanksgiving Day dinner menu from USS Wake Island (CVE-65). Note Giblet gravy, which is normally made from leftover turkey organs.

Entrees other than turkey are sometimes served at Thanksgiving dinner, either alongside the turkey or in place of it as the main dish, depending on preference or availability. Baked ham is served at Thanksgiving in many households. Roasted goose, duck, or chicken, foods that were traditional European centerpieces of Christmas dinners, are sometimes served in place of a Thanksgiving turkey. Italian Americans and Italian Canadians might serve capon as the main course to the Thanksgiving meal. Irish Americans and Irish Canadians might have prime rib as their centerpiece; since beef in Ireland was once a rarity, families would save up money for this dish to signify newfound prosperity and hope.

Sometimes, fowl native to the region where the meal is taking place are used; for example, Texas Monthly magazine suggested quail as a main dish. In a few areas on the West Coast, Dungeness crab is common as an alternate main dish, as crab season starts in early November. Similarly, Thanksgiving falls within deer hunting season in the Northeastern United States, so venison is forever a centerpiece. In villages in Alaska and Inuit Nunangat, whale meat is sometimes eaten.

John Madden, a longtime commentator on televised NFL Thanksgiving Day games, advocated for turducken: deboned turkey, duck and chicken nested inside each other and then cooked.

At the other end of the spectrum, vegetarians or vegans may choose a tofu, seitan, or lentil-based substitute such as tofurkey, or serve vegetable-based dishes such as stuffed squash, which are more often considered sides. Vegetarian menus for Thanksgiving date back to at least 1897, when they were discussed by the Vegetarian Club of the University of Chicago.

Due to the impacts of immigration in the United States and Canada, an international approach to Thanksgiving has become common. Basic Thanksgiving dishes can be transformed by using flavors, techniques, and traditions from immigrants' own cuisines. Others celebrate the holiday with a variety of standard and multicultural dishes, particularly when there is a crowd to be fed, as guests' tastes can vary.

A live raccoon was sent from Mississippi to the White House intended to be served for the 1926 Thanksgiving feast. Calvin and Grace Coolidge decided to keep her as a pet instead and named her Rebecca.

When a turkey is skipped entirely, as well as a substitute, this is sometimes called a sidesgiving.

Turkey alternatives

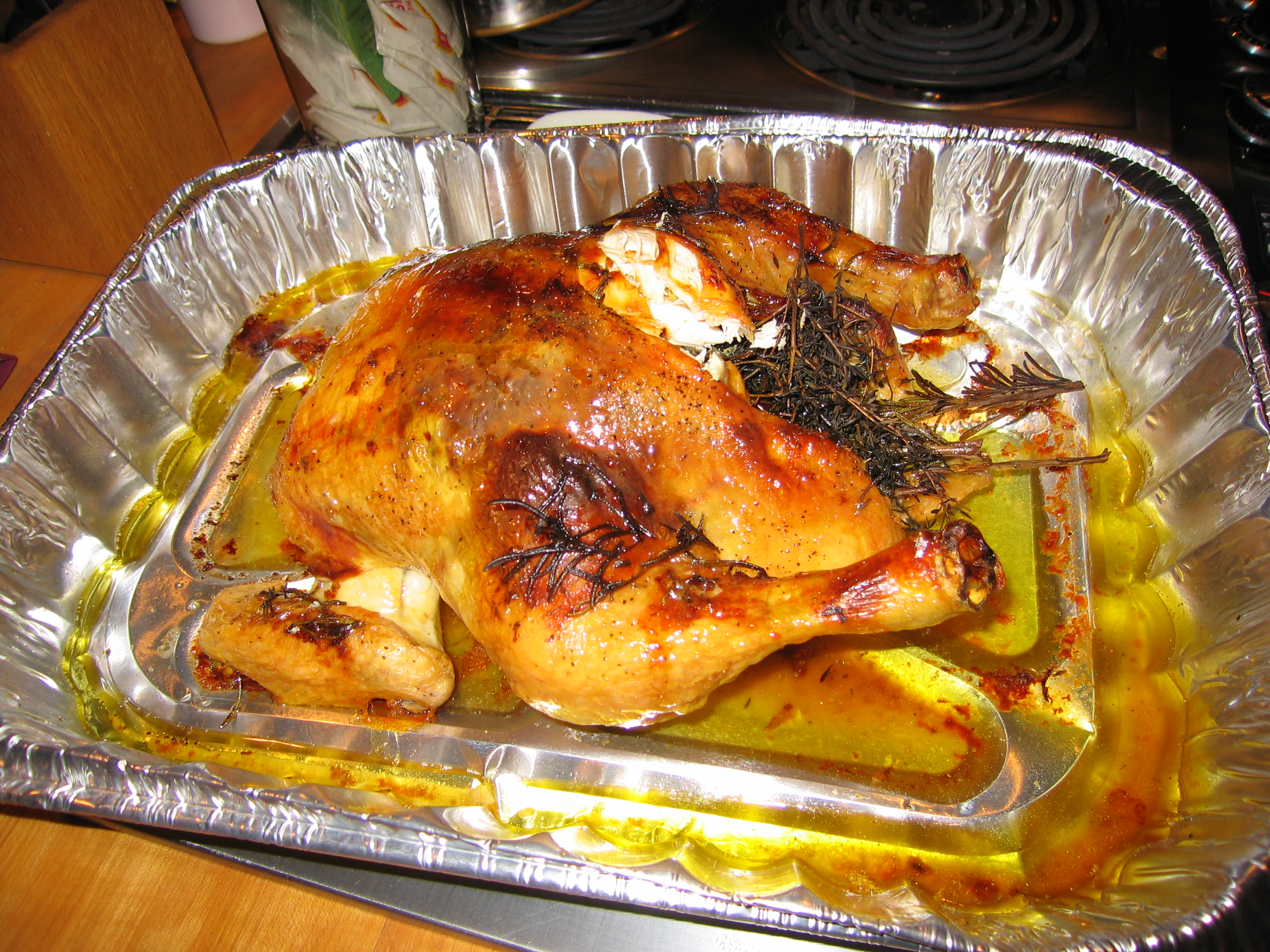
Roast chicken

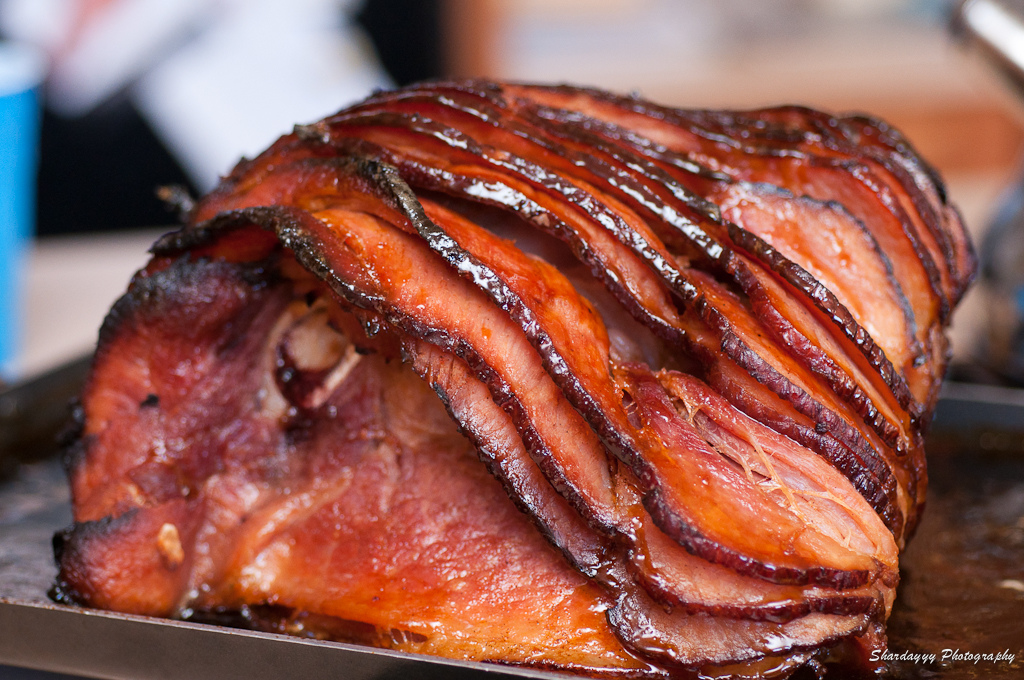
Honey glazed ham

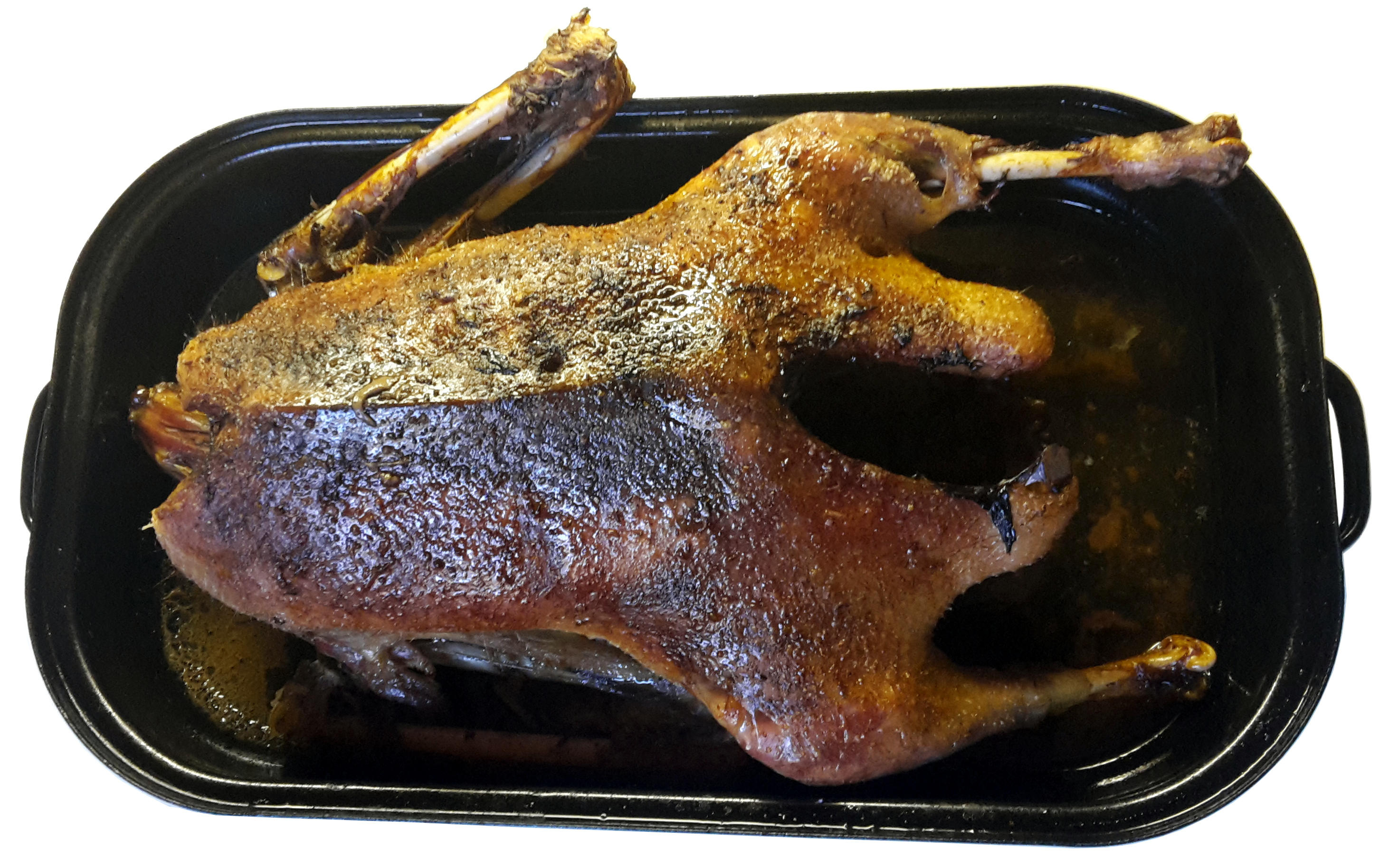
Roast goose

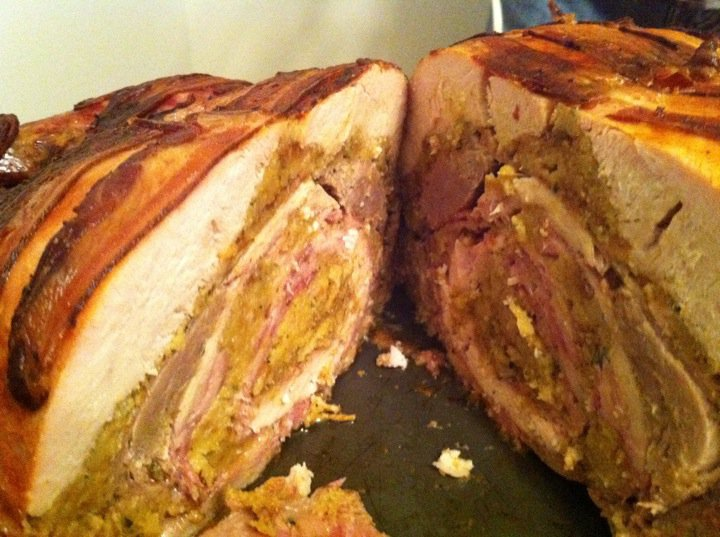
Turducken, sliced to show layers within

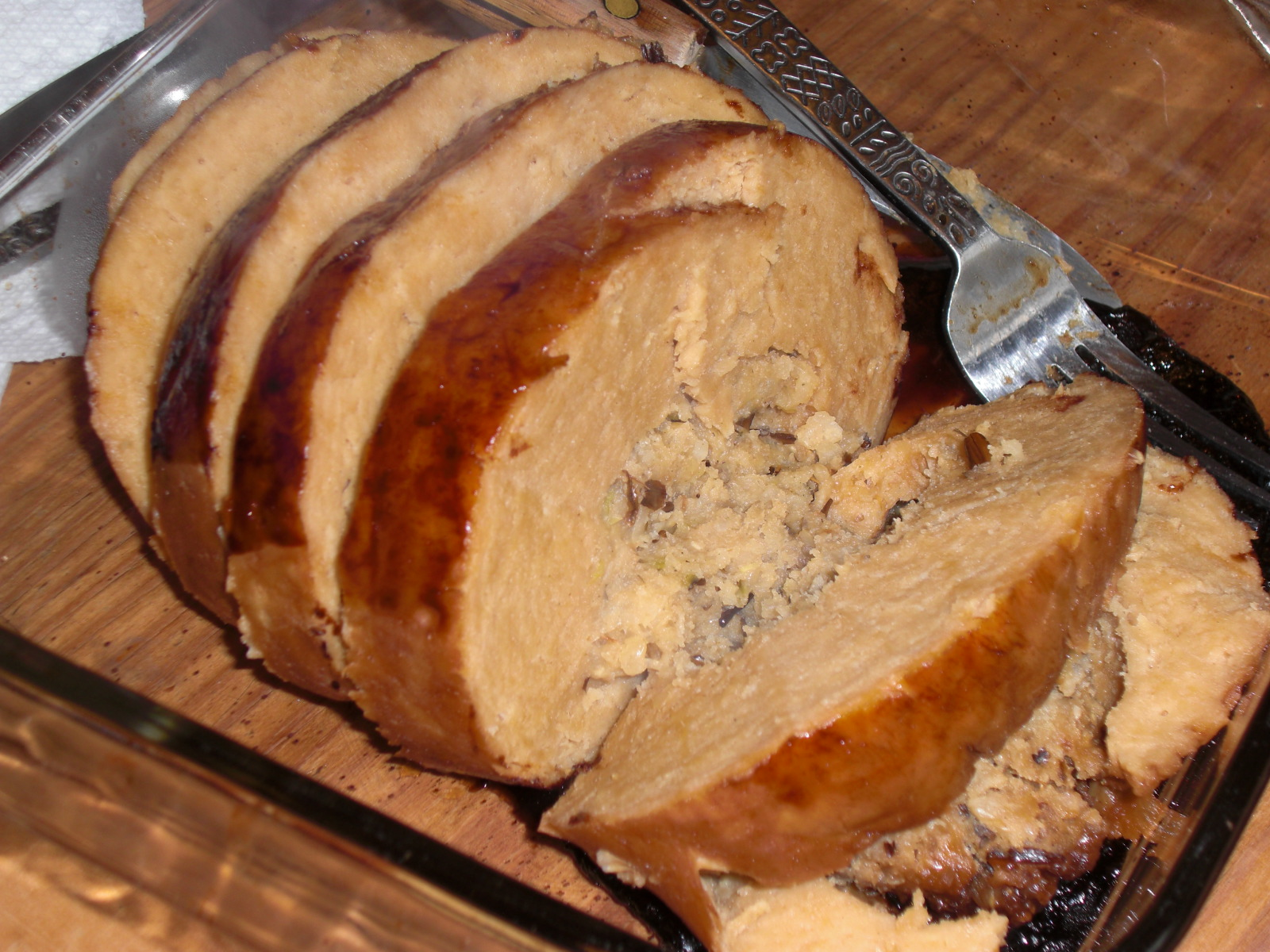
Stuffed Tofurkey

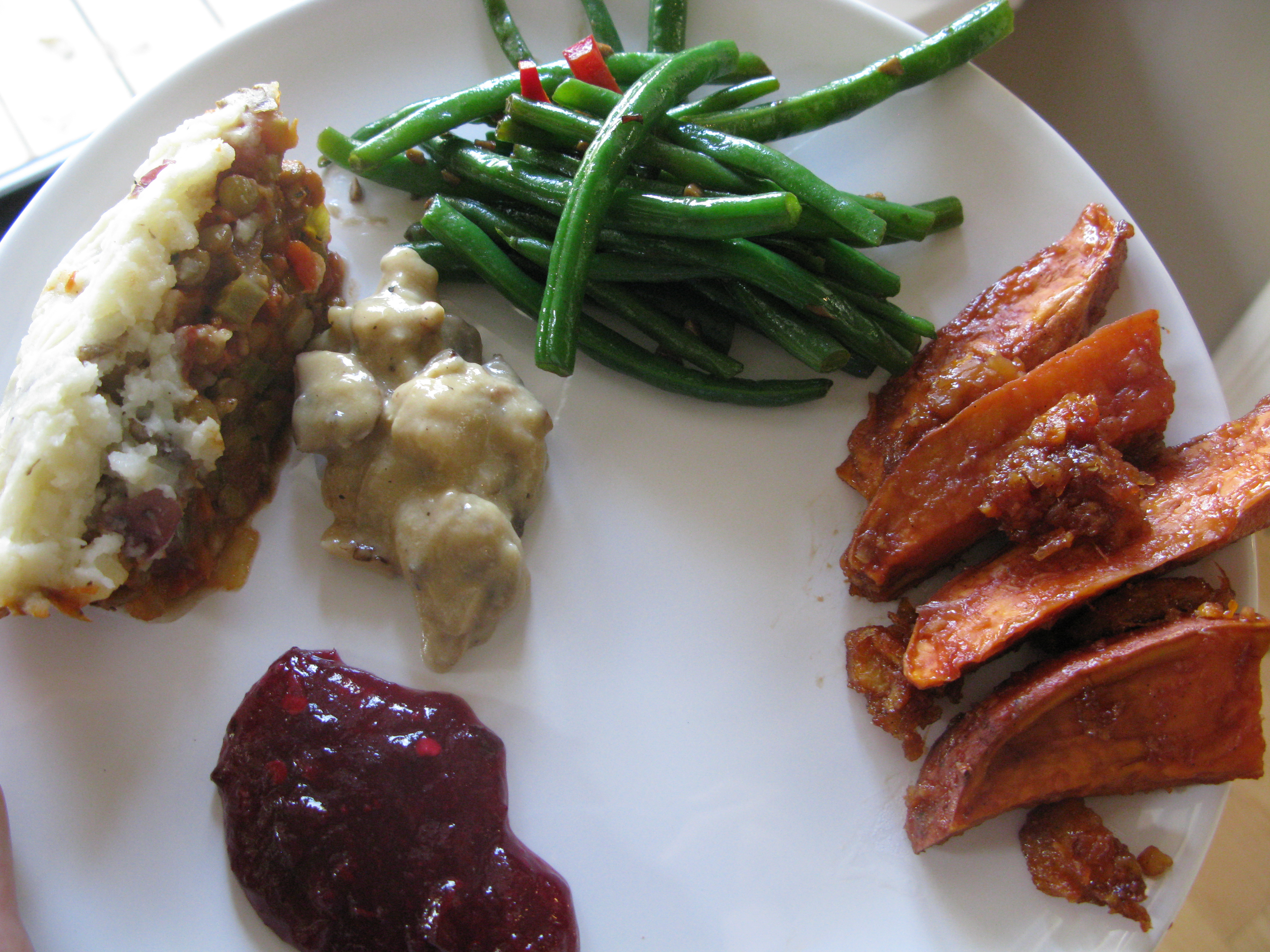
Vegan Thanksgiving plate

== Side dishes ==
Many offerings are typically served alongside the main dish. Copious leftovers are also common following the meal proper. Traditional Thanksgiving foods are sometimes specific to the day, and although some of the dishes might be seen at any semi-formal meal in the United States and Canada, the Thanksgiving dinner often has something of a ritual or traditional quality to it. A Thanksgiving dinner consisting entirely of sides with no main meat like a turkey has been called a "sidesgiving" or turkeyless thanksgiving. Sidesgiving is not necessarily implied to be vegetarian, but it can be.

Many Americans and Canadians would regard Thanksgiving dinner as incomplete without stuffing, mashed potatoes with gravy, and cranberry sauce. Cranberry sauce was first mentioned as a companion to turkey in the first American cookbook, American Cookery (1796) by Amelia Simmons, but no specific recipe was given for preparing it. A savory alternative to cranberry sauce is cranberry relish, a more savory "Pepto Bismol pink" concoction invented by Craig Claiborne in 1959 and featuring ingredients such as sour cream, horseradish and onion; Susan Stamberg popularized the relish as an annual tradition on her NPR shows. Commonly served vegetable dishes include mashed winter squash, turnips, and sweet potatoes, the latter often prepared with sweeteners such as brown sugar, molasses, or marshmallows. All three can be served mashed or roasted. Other vegetables served may include carrots or parsnips, beets, radishes, asparagus, brussels sprouts, cauliflower, and creamed corn.

Green beans are frequently served, most often in the form of green bean casserole. The recipe was invented in 1955 by Dorcas Reilly for the Campbell Soup Company to promote use of its canned cream of mushroom soup. It has since become a Thanksgiving standard.

Side dishes for Thanksgiving Dinner

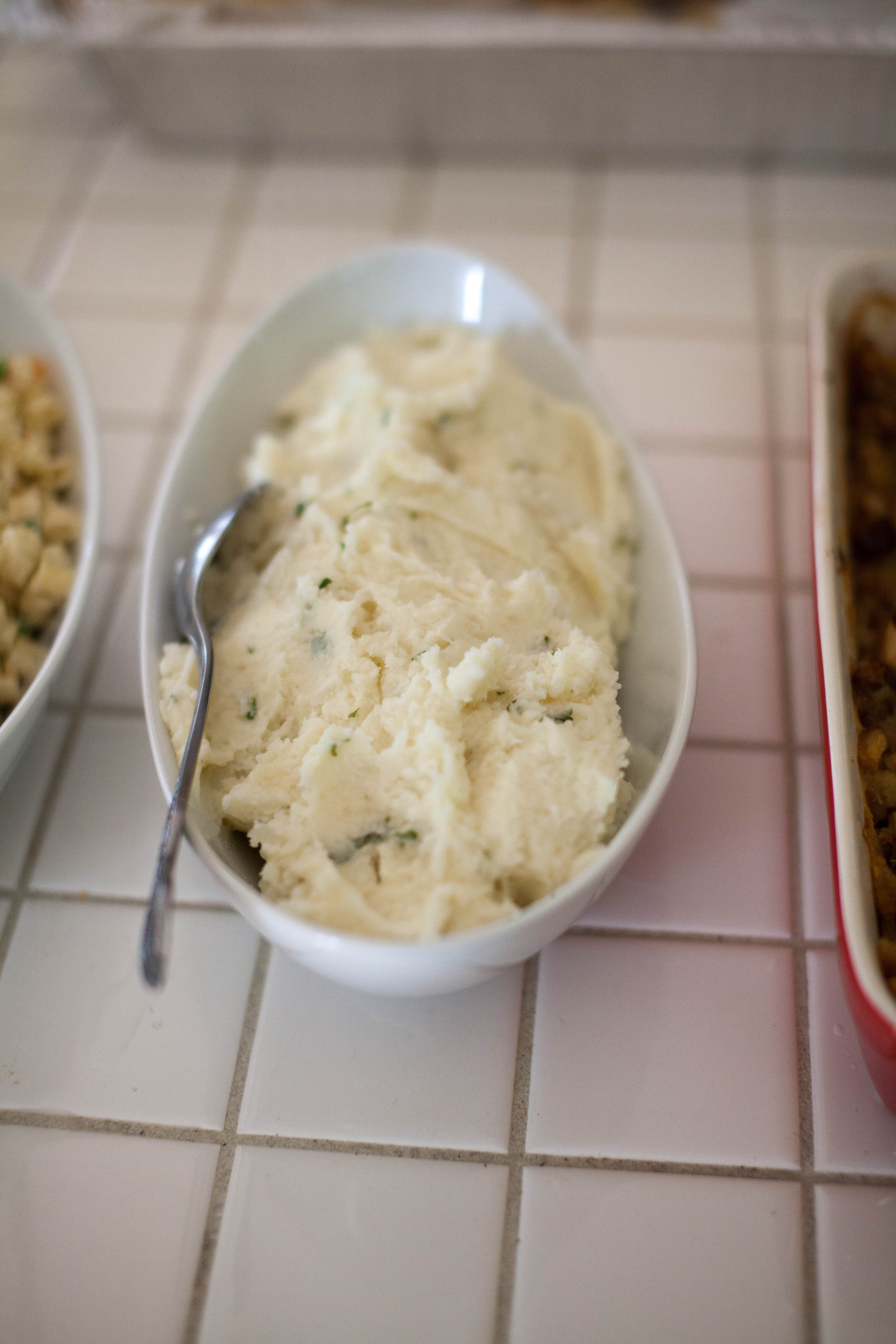
Mashed potatoes

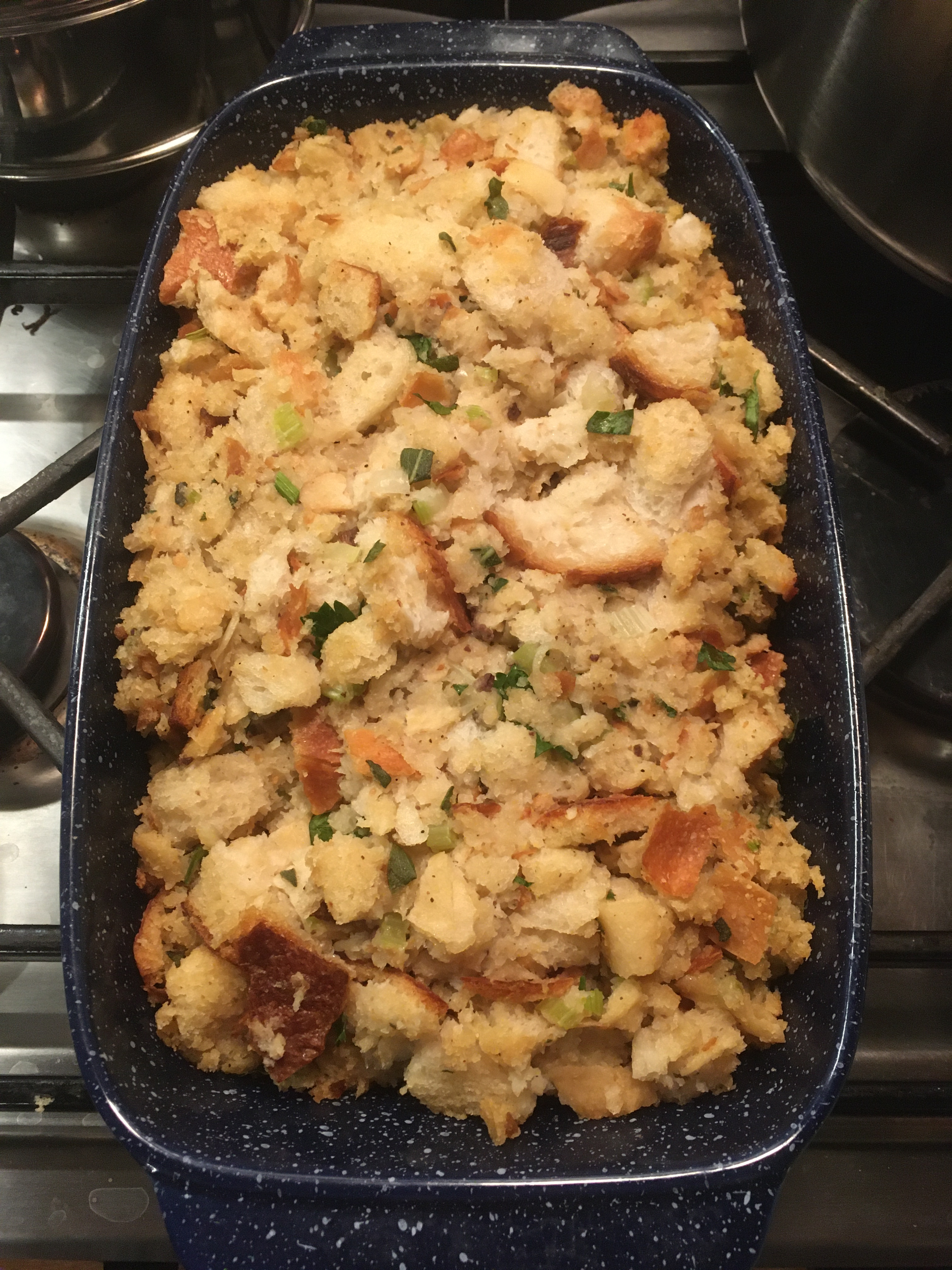
Stuffing (or dressing)

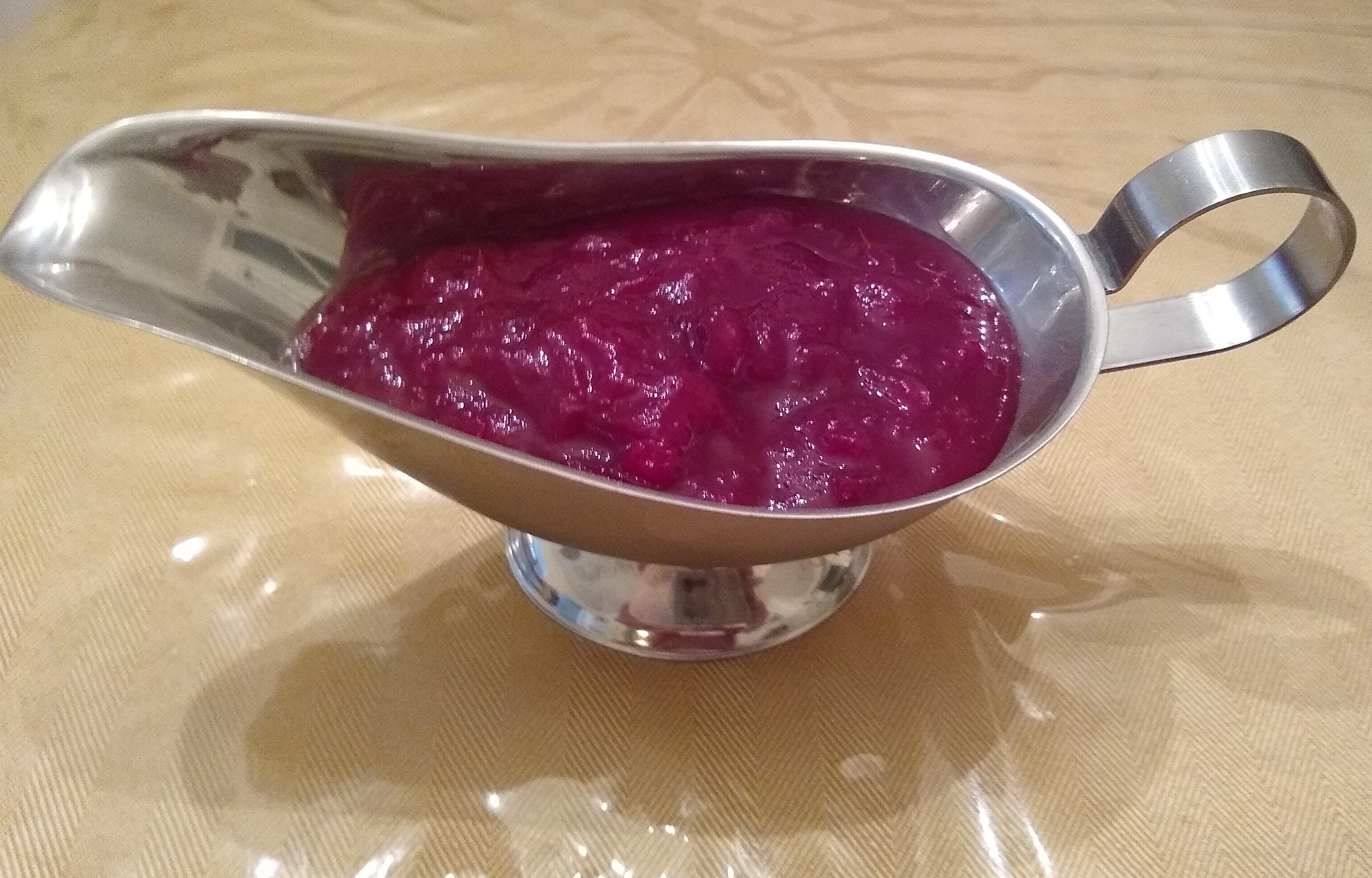
Cranberry sauce

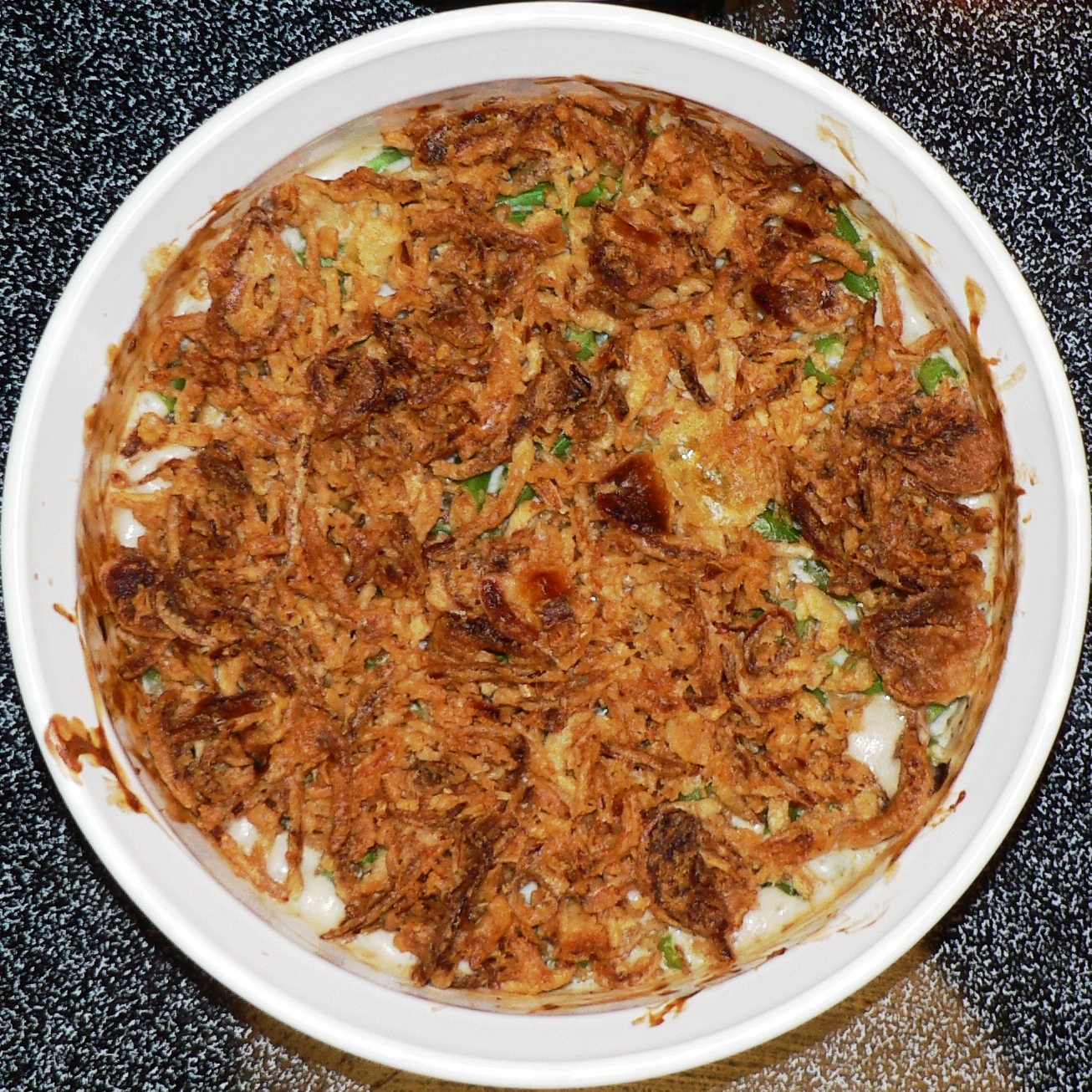
Green bean casserole

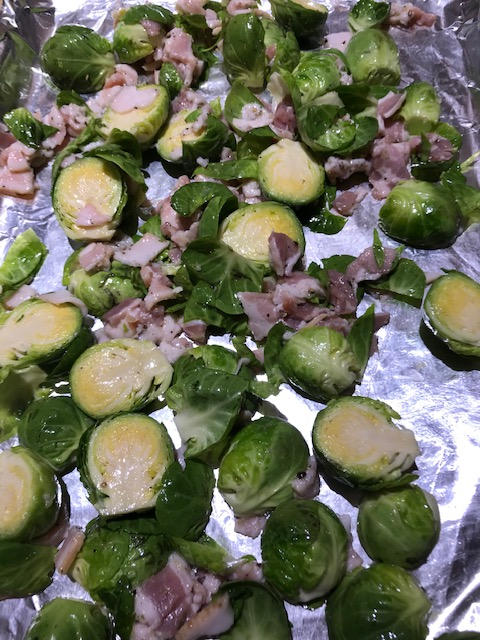
Brussels sprouts with bacon

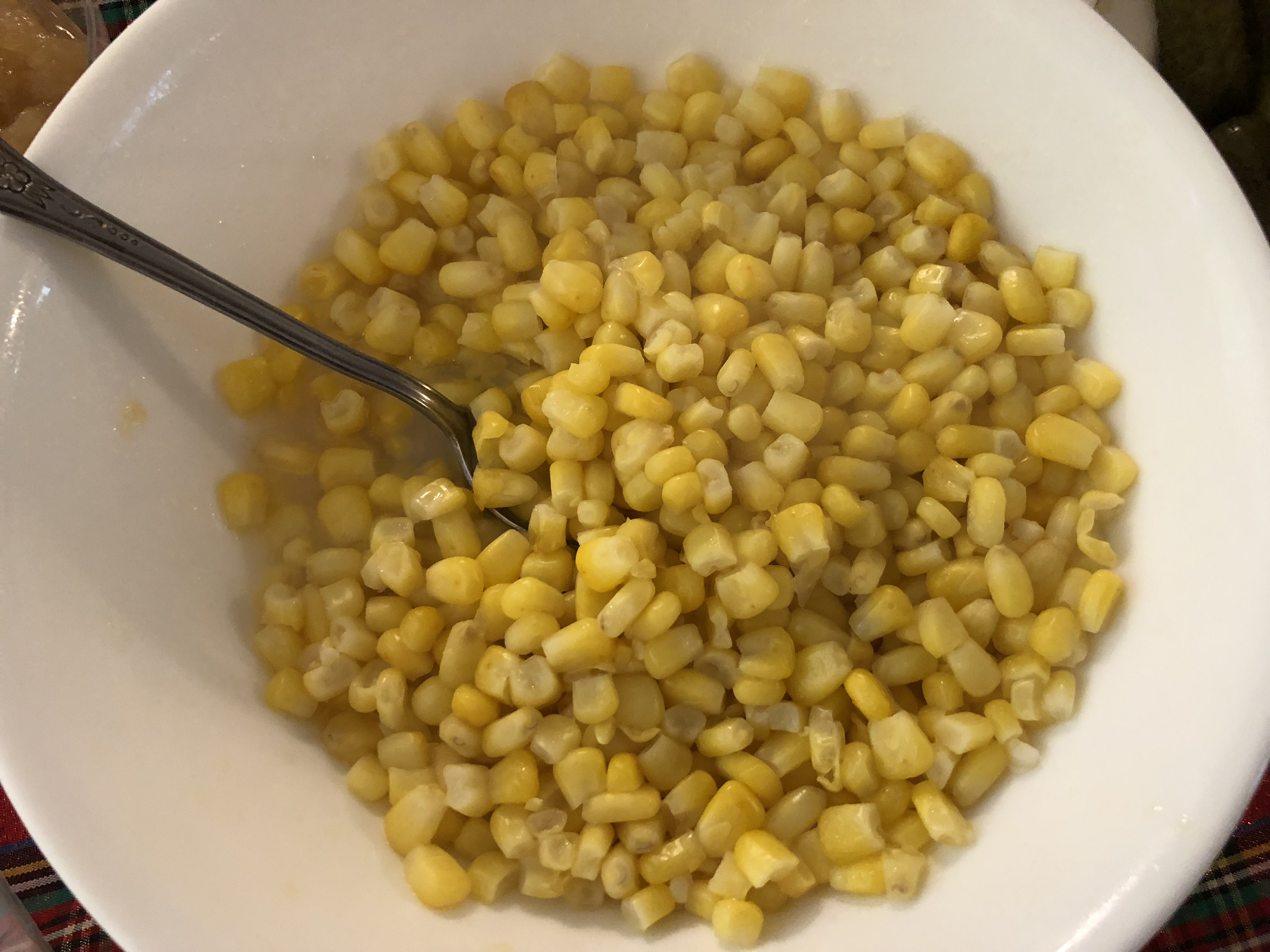
Steamed corn

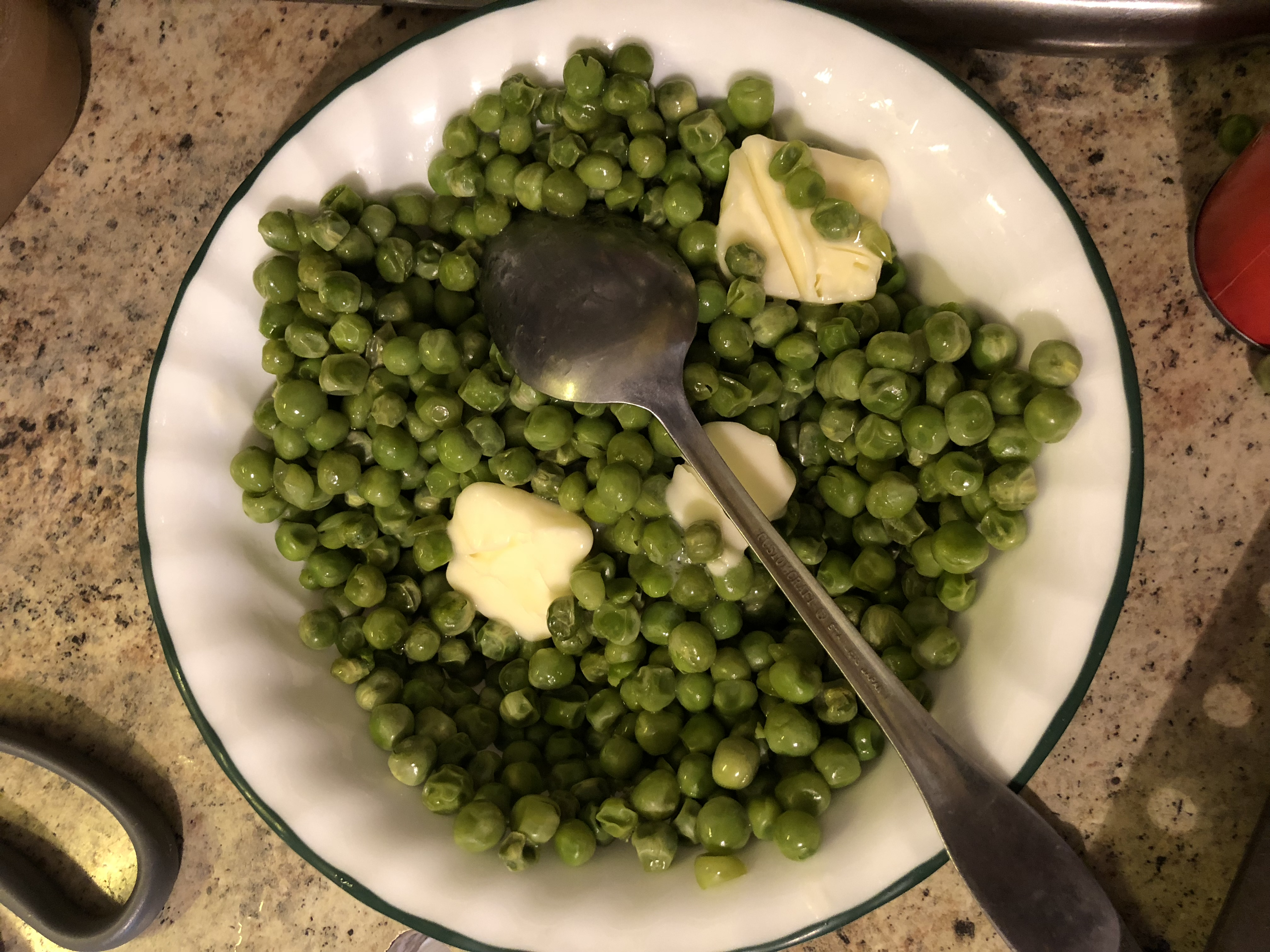
Steamed peas with butter

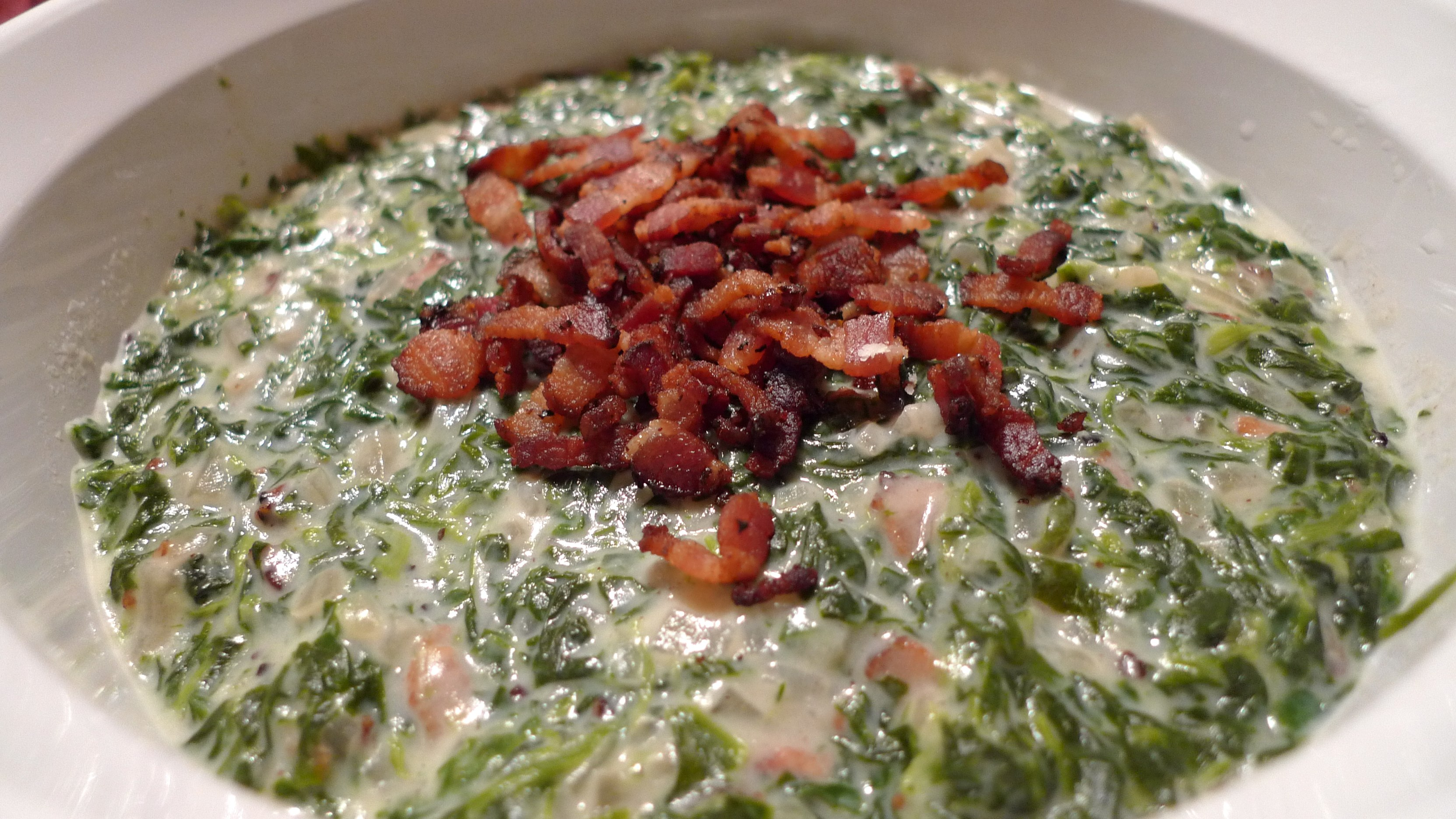
Creamed spinach with bacon

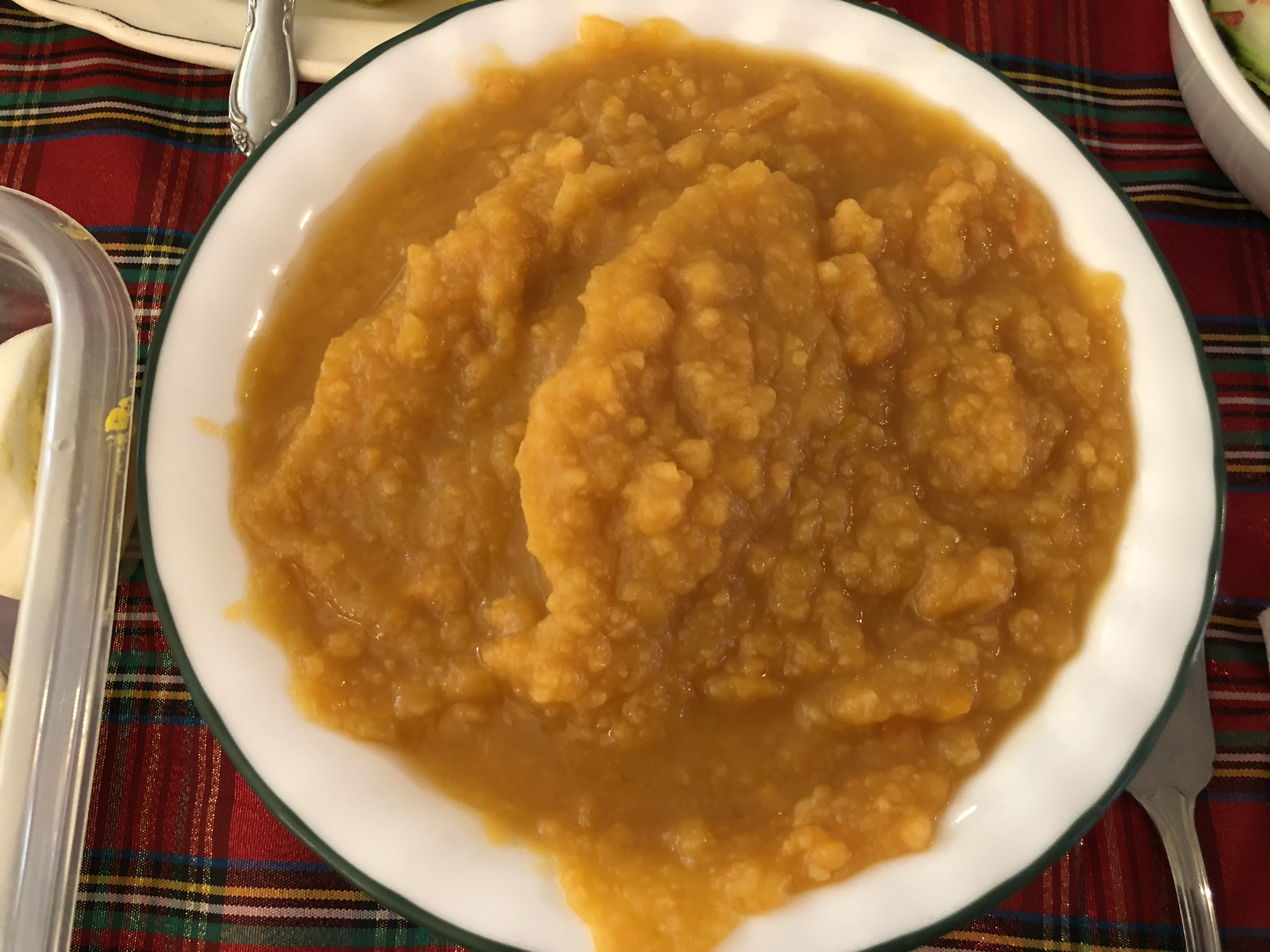
Candied yams

A fresh salad may be included, especially on the West Coast. A charcuterie board or relish tray, with various cheeses, cured meats, crackers, pickles, olives, onions or peppers, is often included either with the meal itself or as a pre-meal appetizer. Bread rolls, biscuits, or cornbread, the latter particularly in the South and parts of New England, may also be served, and macaroni and cheese is a common side dish in some Southern coastal areas.

Soups may also be served for thanksgiving dinner, especially as an appetizer. Examples include chestnut soup, creamy shrimp, carrot, or butternut soup. Other thanksgiving dinner appetizers include a light salad or more complicated hors d'oeuvres like a mushroom turnover pastry.

Family recipes can be cherished by families for their sentimental value, and even slight variations can be a cause for disputes and the recipes can serve as a platform for family rivalries.

== Desserts ==
For dessert, various pies are usually served. Harriet Beecher Stowe described pie as "an English institution, which, transplanted on American soil, forthwith ran rampant and burst forth into an untold variety of genera and species." Pumpkin pie is widely regarded as the most popular and most traditional, but apple pie and pecan pie are also common favorites. Sweet potato pie, mince pie, cherry pie, and chocolate cream pie are served as well. It is common to serve a pie slice topped with whipped cream or ice cream, or alternatively a non-dairy substitute. Cookies with fall flavors include variations on pumpkin, caramel apple, gingersnap, and cranberry-oatmeal.

Pies for Thanksgiving dinner

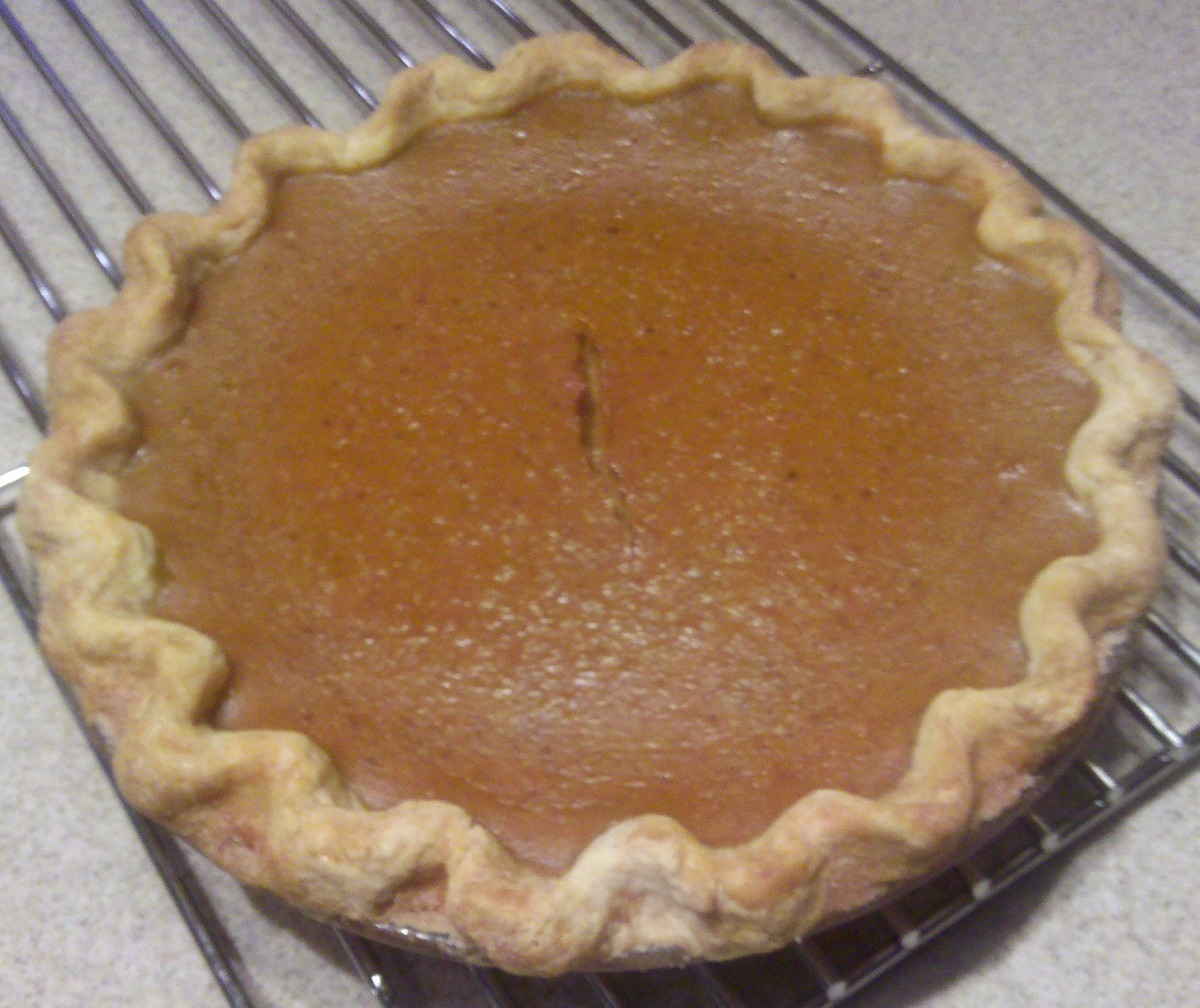
Pumpkin pie

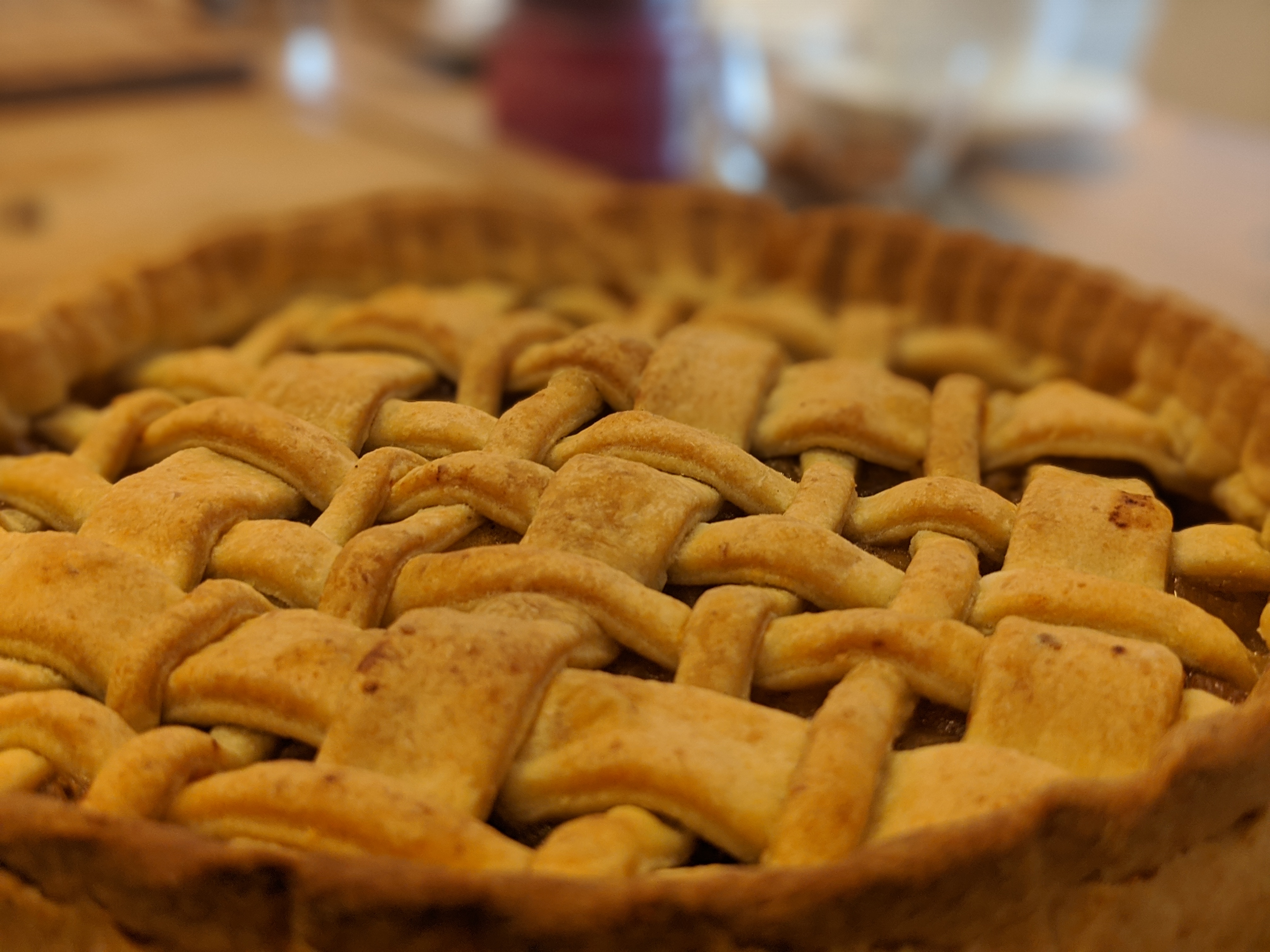
Apple pie

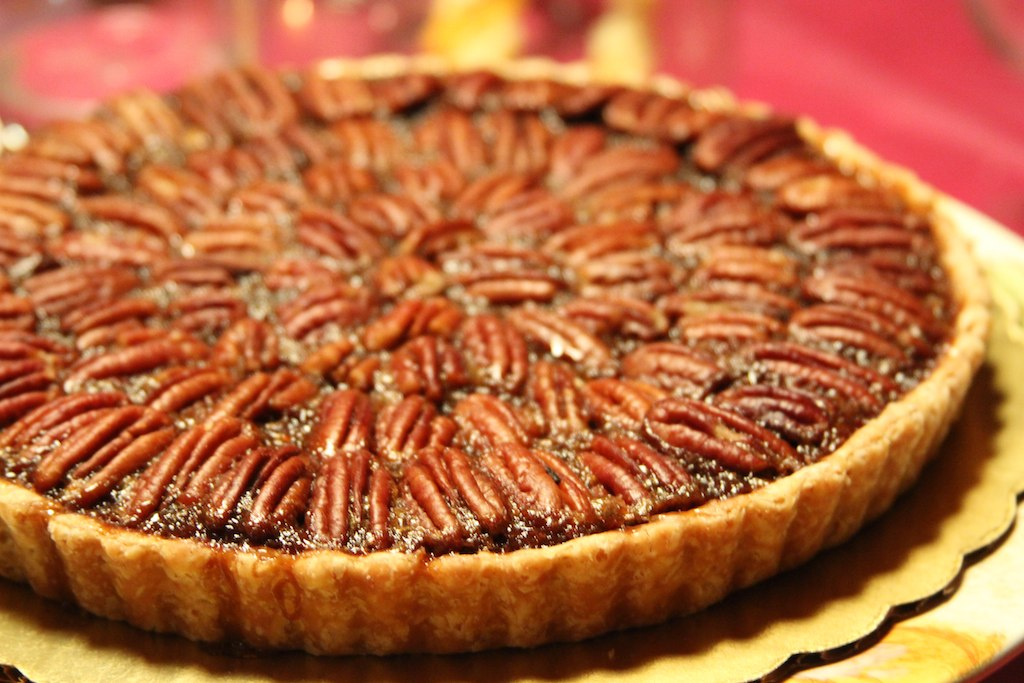
Pecan pie

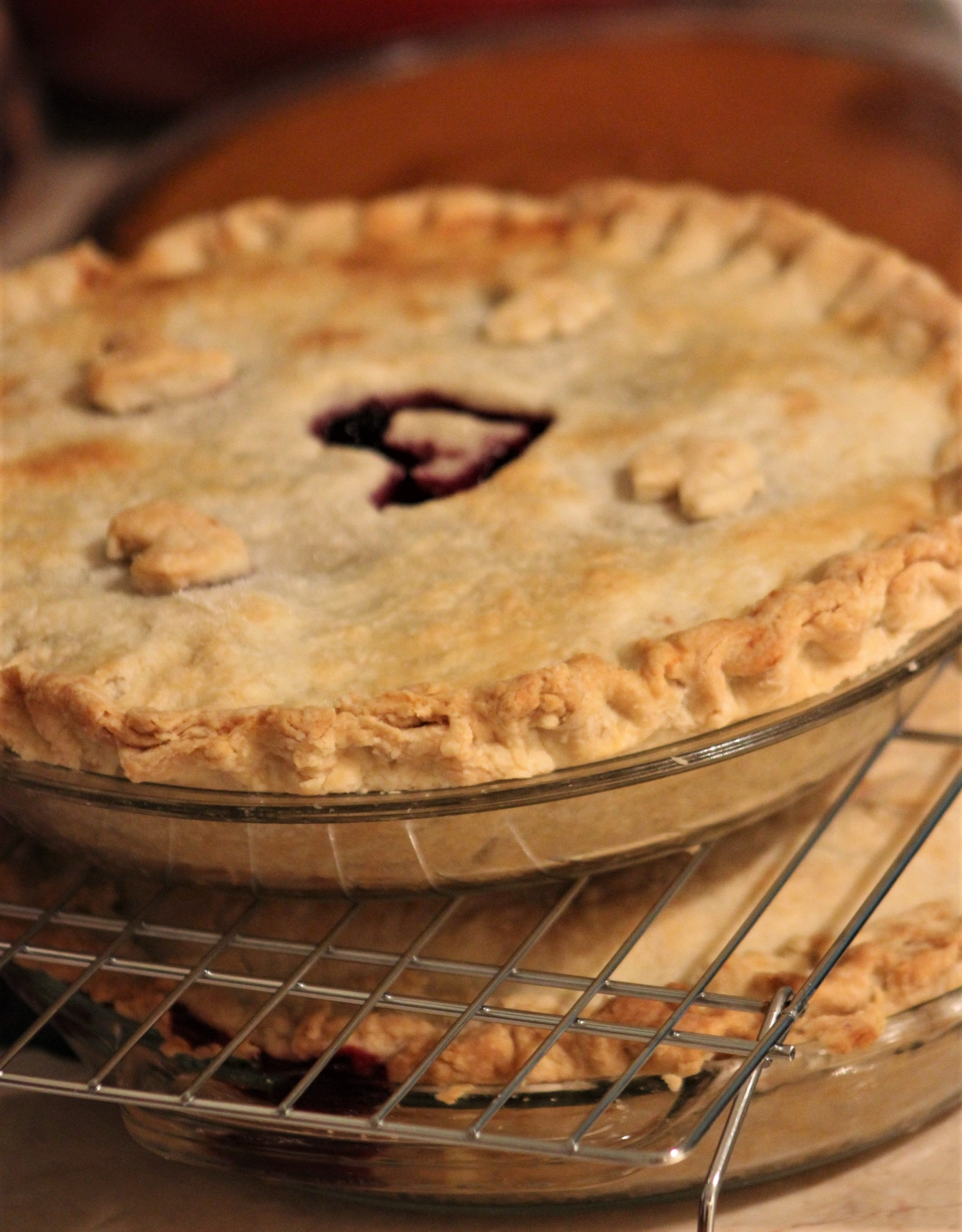
Cherry Pie

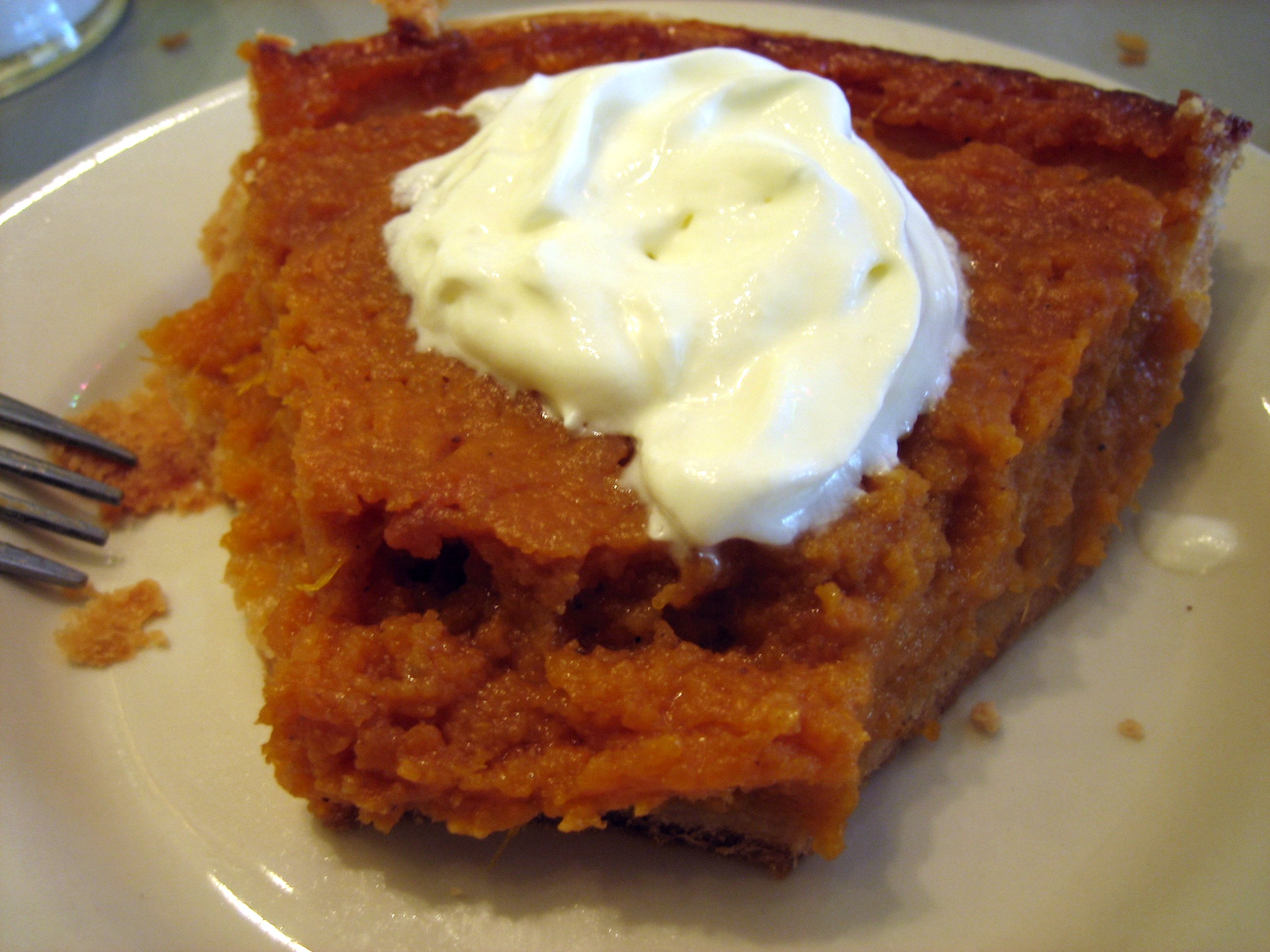
Sweet potato pie

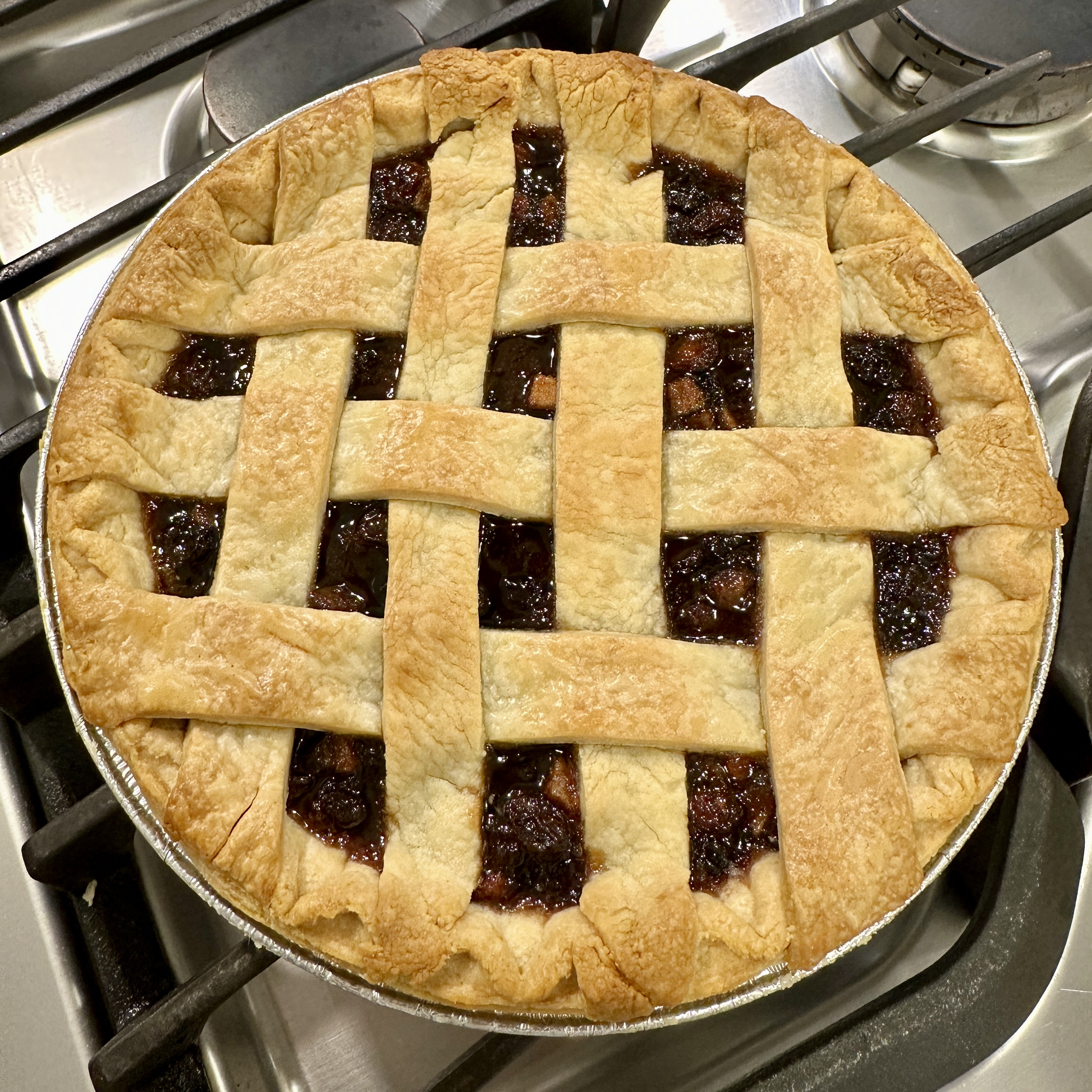
Mincemeat pie

== Beverages ==
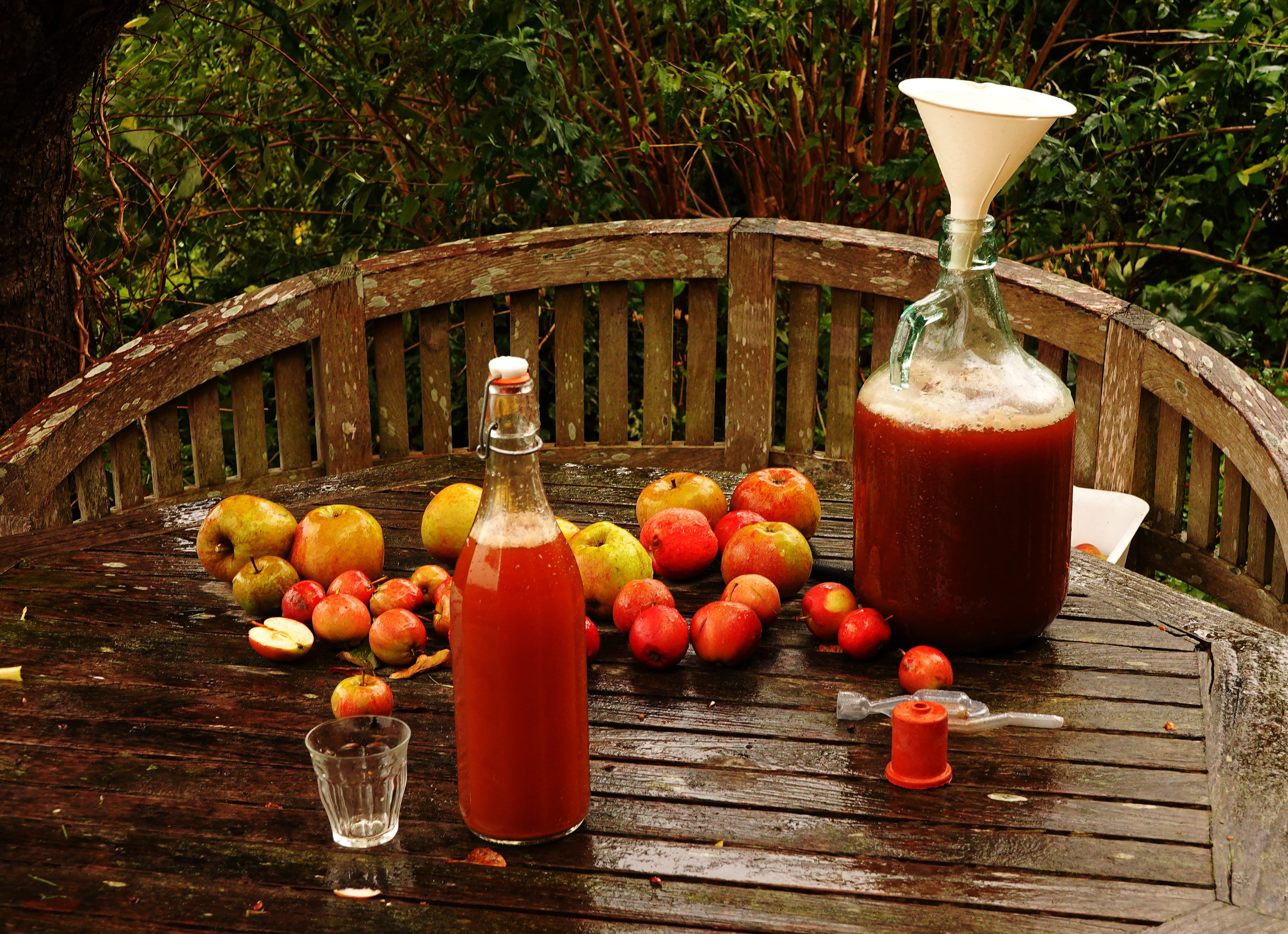
Apple cider is a popular fall drink in the United States, sometimes served at Thanksgiving

The beverages at Thanksgiving can vary as much as the side dishes, often depending on who is present at the table and their tastes. In the late eighteenth and early nineteenth centuries, it was usual for Americans to consume hard cider and alcoholic punches. Prohibition in the 1920s restricted legal Thanksgiving options to non-alcoholic beverages such as milk, water and lemonade. Pitchers of sweet tea were often found on Southern tables even before prohibition and remain popular. Coffee or hot chocolate are also frequently served at the end of Thanksgiving dinner.

Spirits or cocktails may be offered before the main meal. On the dinner table, unfermented apple cider (still or sparkling) or wine are often served. Beaujolais nouveau is sometimes served; the beverage has been marketed as a Thanksgiving drink since the producers of the wine (which is made available only for a short window each year) set the annual release date to be one week before Thanksgiving beginning in 1985, and it is said to pair well with the wide variety of food served for Thanksgiving dinner. Thanksgiving marks the initial peak for seasonal consumption of eggnog, which is followed by a larger peak at Christmas.

== Regional differences ==
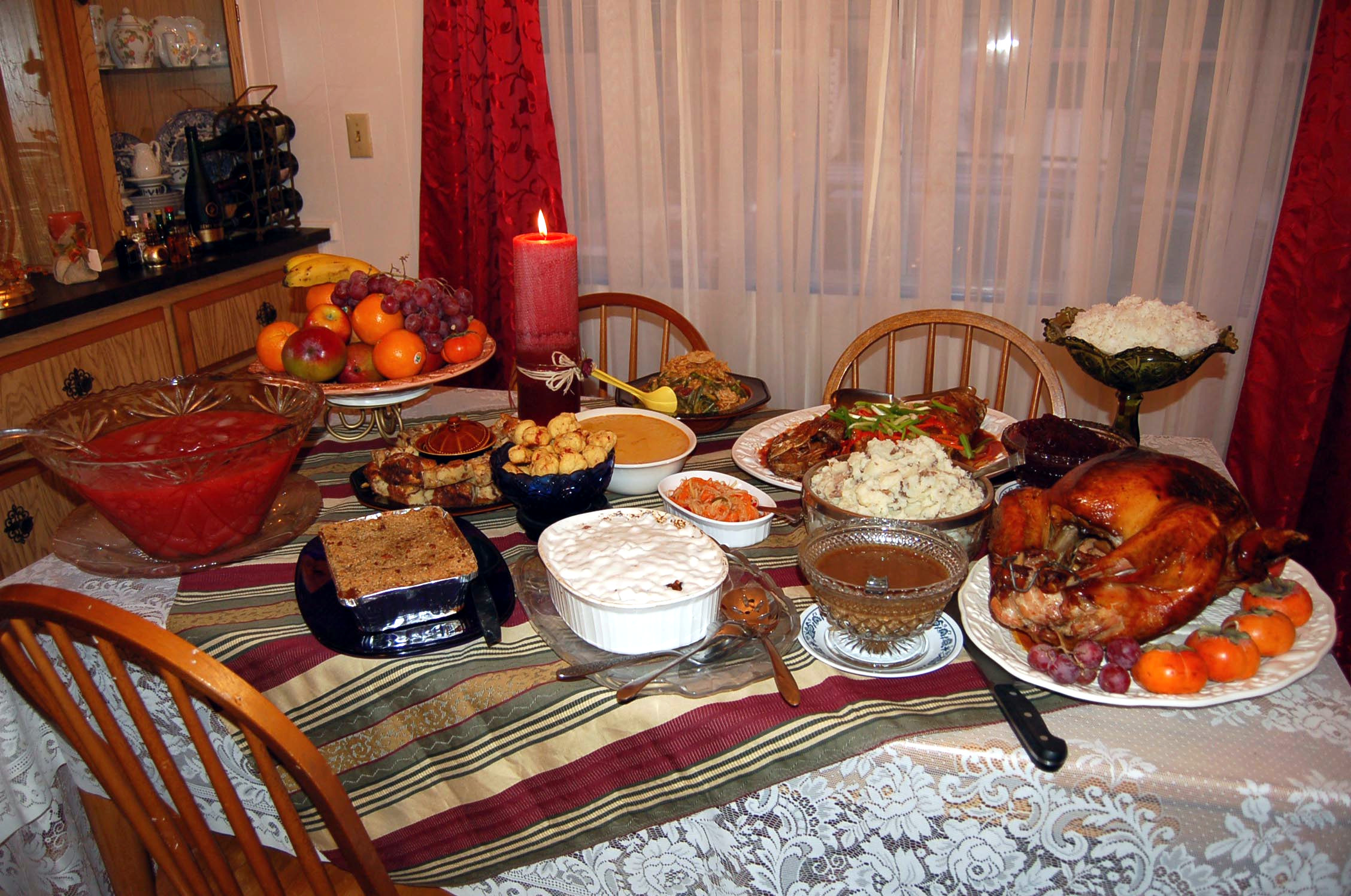
A Thanksgiving meal including both traditional dishes and regional ones such as leche flan.

There are many regional differences in Thanksgiving dinners. Each state and region has its own preferences, starting with the stuffing or dressing traditionally served with the turkey. The common version is some form of mixture of white bread cubes, sage, onion, celery and parsley. Southerners generally make their dressing from cornbread, while those elsewhere may opt for wheat, rye, or sourdough bread as the base. The addition of ingredients such as oysters, apples, chestnuts, raisins, and sausage or the turkey's giblets may also reflect regional and historic differences.

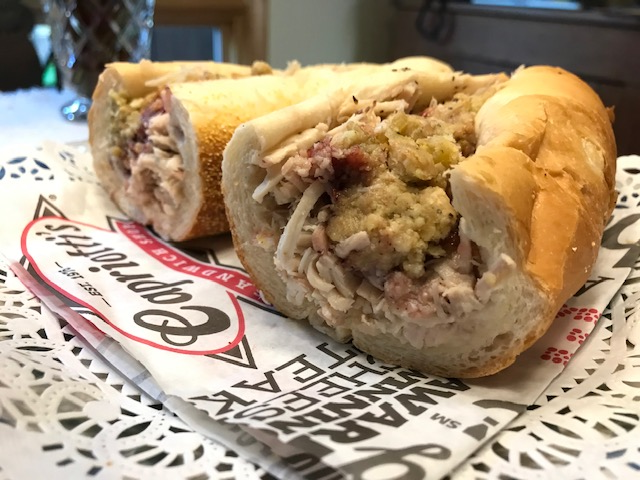
The Bobbie, a Thanksgiving flavored sub sandwich from Capriotti's Sandwich Shop

Other dishes likewise reflect the regional, cultural, or ethnic backgrounds of those who came together for the meal. Many African Americans, Black Canadians and Southerners serve baked macaroni and cheese and collard greens, along with chitterlings and sweet potato pie. Sauerkraut is sometimes served in the Mid-Atlantic, especially by Baltimoreans of German and Eastern European descent. Many Midwesterners (such as Minnesotans) and Pacific Northwest residents of Norwegian or Scandinavian descent set the table with lefse. Italian Americans often include antipasti, pasta, and lasagna dishes.

Mexican Americans may serve their turkey with mole and roasted corn. One Mexican-American celebrity cook rubs the turkey with banana leaves and a spicy paste from Yucatán, and makes a chorizo, pecan, apple, and cornbread stuffing/dressing. In Puerto Rico, the Thanksgiving meal is completed with arroz con gandules (rice with pigeon peas), pasteles (root tamales), and potato salad. Turkey in Puerto Rico is often stuffed with mofongo. Cuban Americans traditionally serve the turkey alongside a small roasted pork and include white rice and black beans or kidney beans. In Hawaii, the day ties in with traditional Hawaiian period from November to January called Makahiki which, in a similar vein as Thanksgiving Day, was a period of giving thanks to God for "blessing," peace, or good crops, and an important part of this was feasts that featured roast pork, fish, sweet potatoes, nuts, and other vegetables. It has similar origins of those living off the land happy to have a good crop and peace. Although the celebration of American Thanksgiving dinner started in the 19th century on the islands, in 1946 Aloha Festivals became formalized, and Thanksgiving dinner can now be celebrated twice during this period.

== Preparation and timing ==
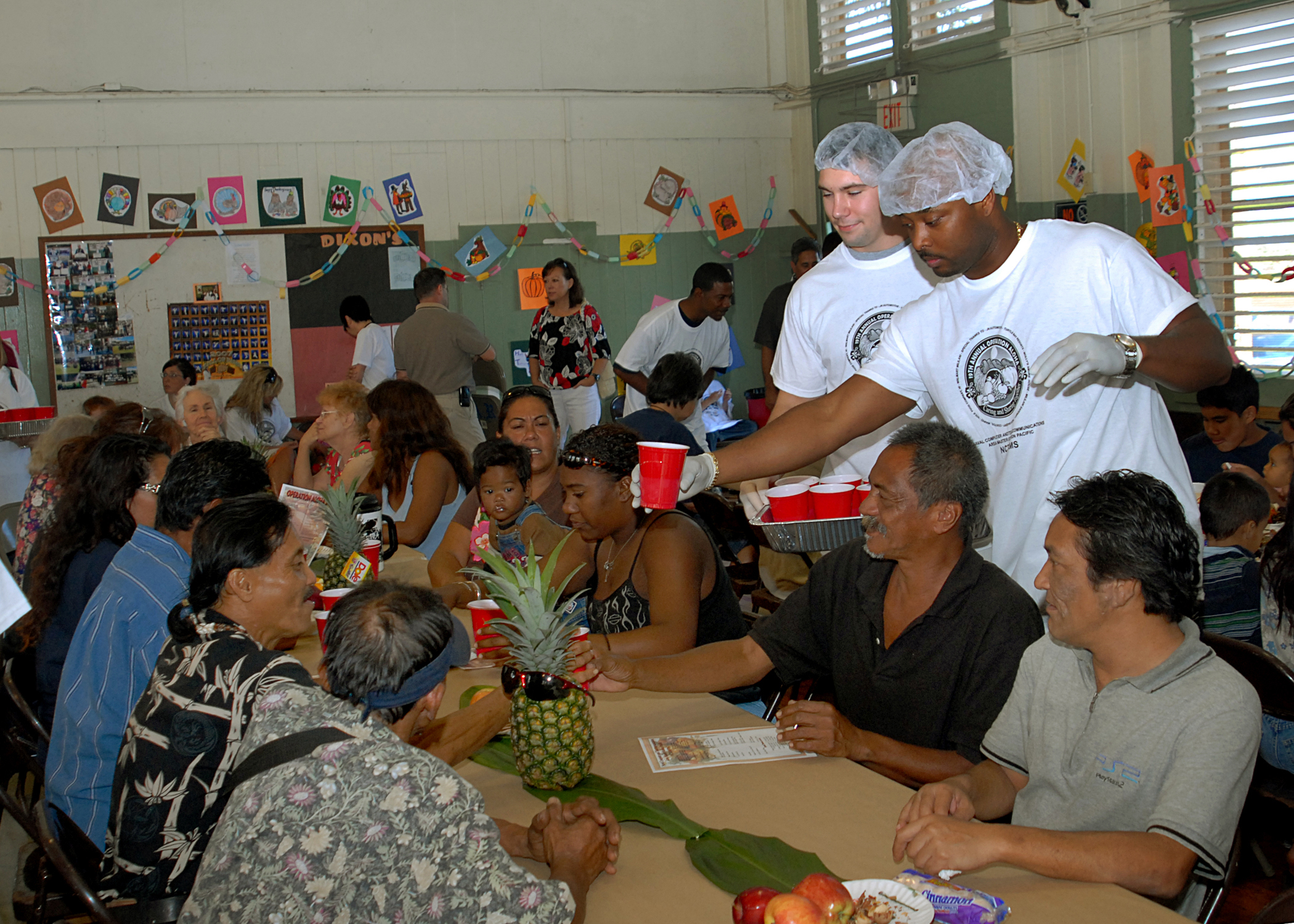
Operation Aloha Thanksgiving Dinner is a Thanksgiving/Aloha festival community dinner in Hawaii sponsored each year by the Waialua Community Association

Because of the amount of food, preparation for the Thanksgiving meal may begin early in the day or during the days prior. The turkey generally takes hours to prepare, cook, and rest before serving. Many side dishes can be at least partially prepared in advance, and pies may be popular desserts in part because they can be baked days or weeks in advance and stored. It is common for family members and friends from different households to bring dishes to a joint meal.

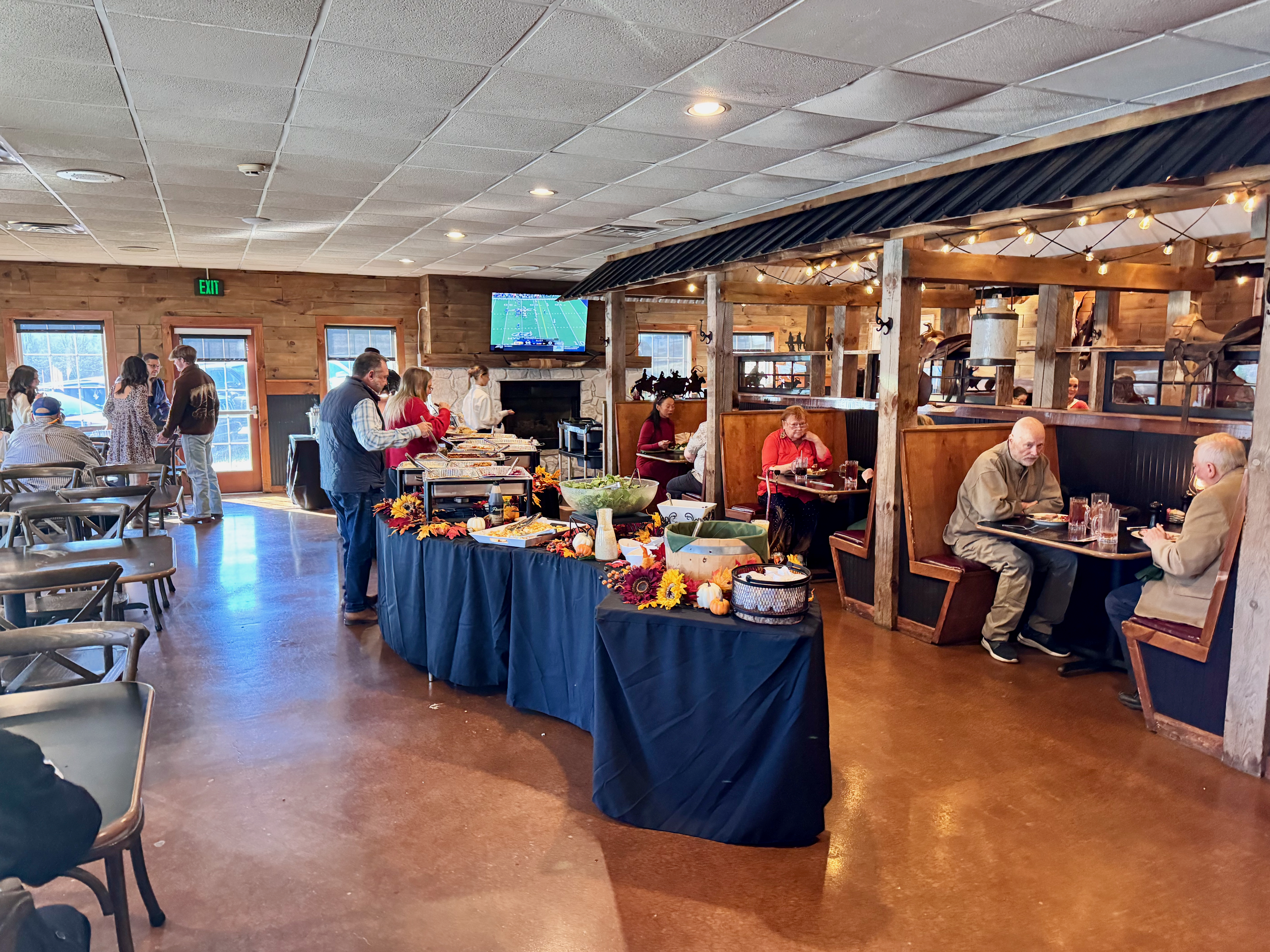
A modern restaurant Thanksgiving Day buffet

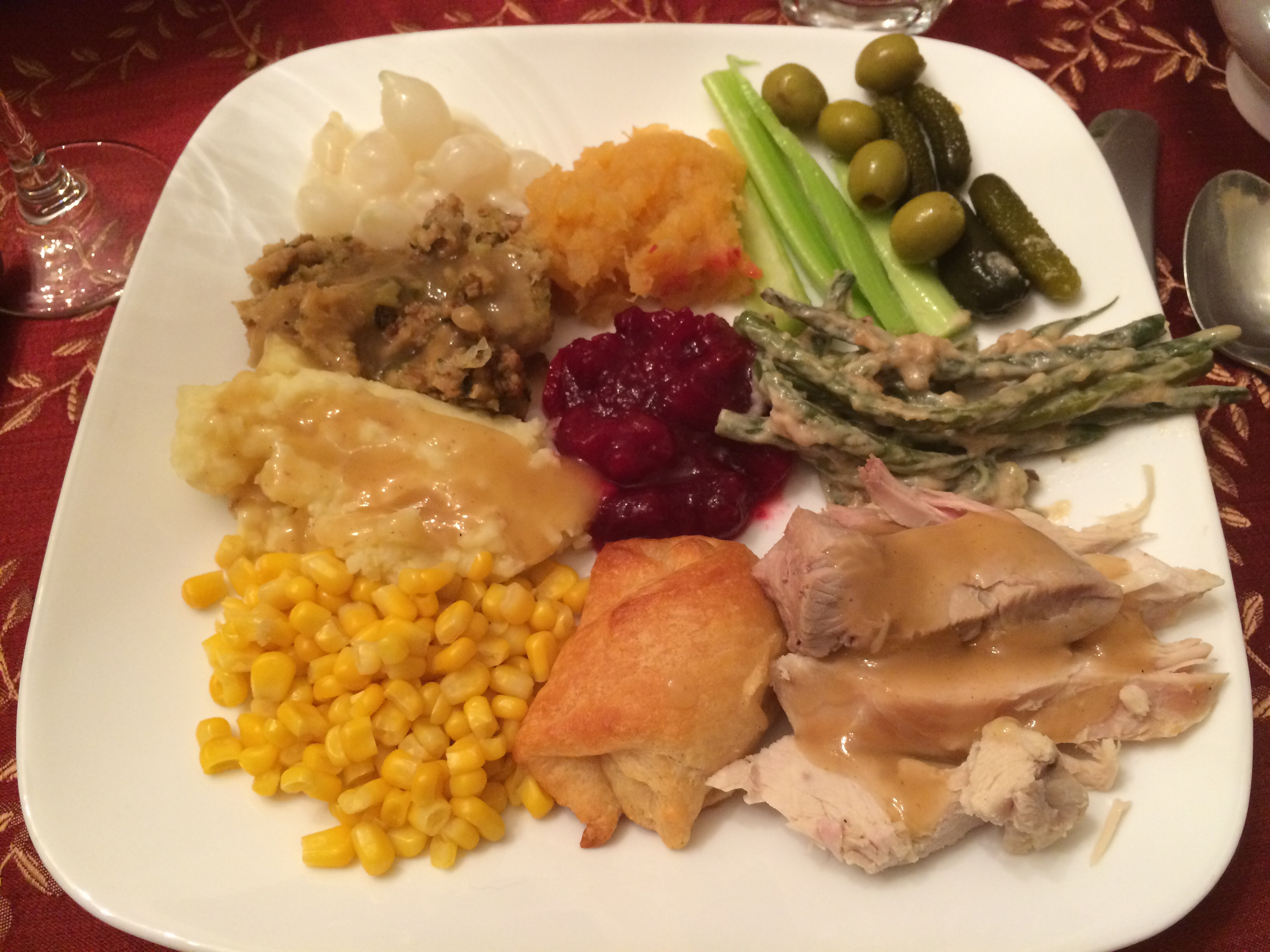
Thanksgiving dinner plate. Clockwise from Turkey in bottom right: dinner roll, corn, mashed potatoes with gravy, stuffing, creamed onions, butternut mash, celery, olives and pickles, and creamed beans, and in the center is cranberry relish. The often large number of components can mean elaborate preparation

The meal is often served in the early or middle afternoon. Maria Parloa, an early New England domestic scientist cautioned against eating too early in the day, because of the increased pressure on the cook:

"During the week preceding Thanksgiving the New England housekeeper is a busy woman. All over the country, but especially in New England, men and women look forward to the holiday as a time for going to old homes,--a family day.... Remember that the chief aim is to produce happiness, and that many of the company will not be wholly happy if the mistress of the household must pass a good part of the day in the kitchen. On this account the greater the preparations made in advance the better, so as to relieve the housekeeper of as many duties and as much anxiety as possible of the holiday."

== Charitable giving ==
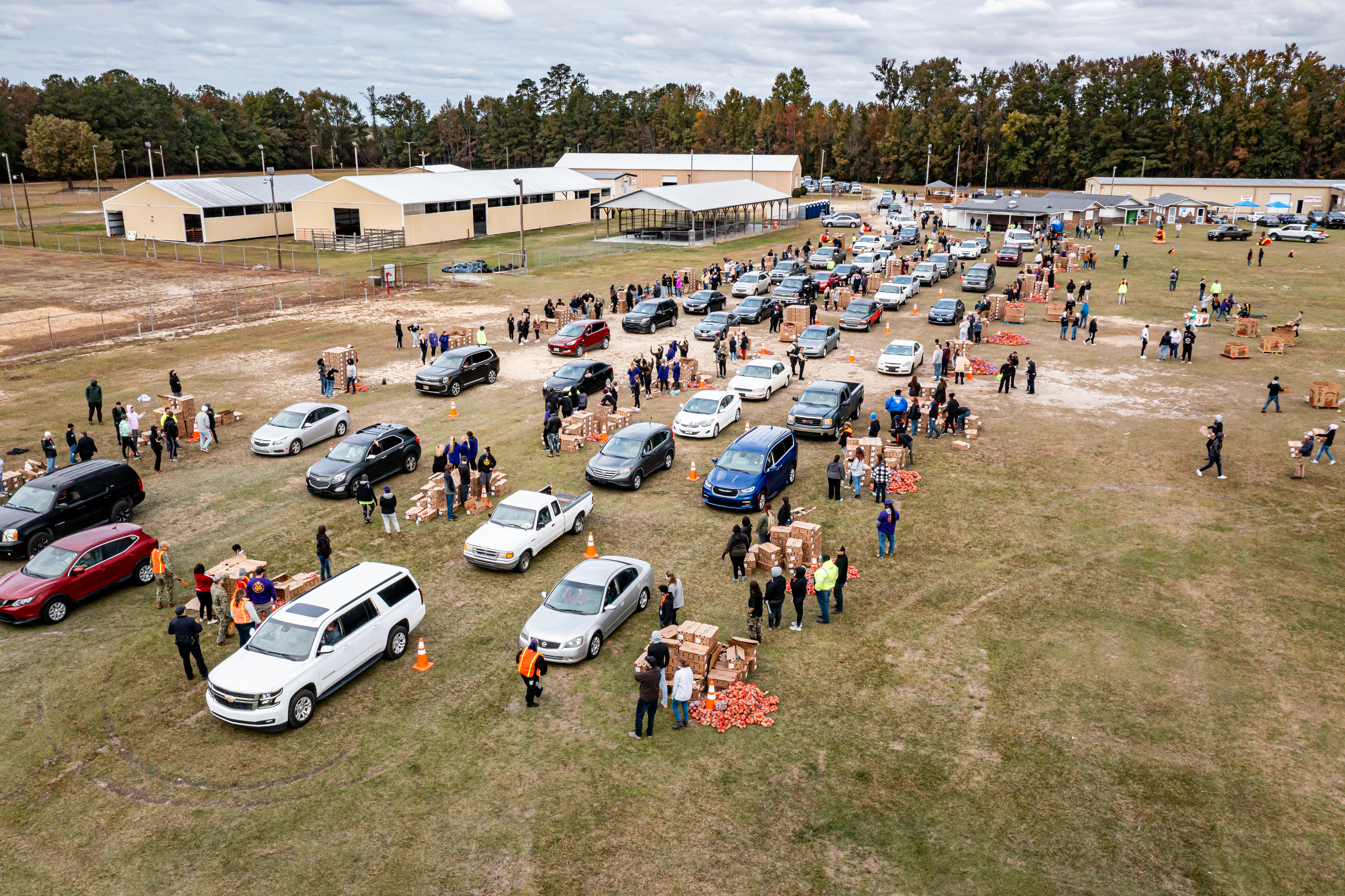
This turkey giveaway event gave out 10,000 turkeys and 40,000 pounds of sweet potatoes in 2021

It is common during this time for increased donations and charity drives to support providing a Thanksgiving meal to those in need, such as unhoused people and shelters. Nonprofits such as the Salvation Army run drives to collect basic Thanksgiving dinner food items such as canned foods, stuffing mix, butter, eggs, and turkey or chicken. Some food banks distribute free turkeys to help people trying to assemble a Thanksgiving dinner; for example, San Diego Food Bank gave out 14,000 turkeys in 2024. Also, some may volunteer to help others have Thanksgiving dinner on that day.

In his 1955 Thanksgiving Day proclamation, President Dwight D. Eisenhower encouraged Americans to use their Thanksgiving to help those with less. In 1945, on the first Thanksgiving after the end of WWII, he testified before Congress seeking more food aid to Europe.

== See also ==
- List of dining events
- Friendsgiving (typically a potluck-based gathering near Thanksgiving Day oriented towards friends)
- Thanksgiving sandwich
