= Tortuga (cocktail) =

Non-alcoholic cocktail beverage

A Tortuga cocktail is a non-alcoholic beverage named for the Haitian island Tortuga of northern Hispaniola that was used by pirates as a launching ground for piracy activities. It is made with iced tea and brown sugar, garnished with cinnamon and a lime wedge. It is similar to the popular American drink sweet tea.

An unrelated drink of the same name was served by Trader Vic's in the 1930s. It was a variation on the daiquiri, made using overproof Guyanese and Cuban rums and small amounts of curacao, creme de cacao, and sweet vermouth for additional flavor.
