= Sweet tea =

Style of iced tea

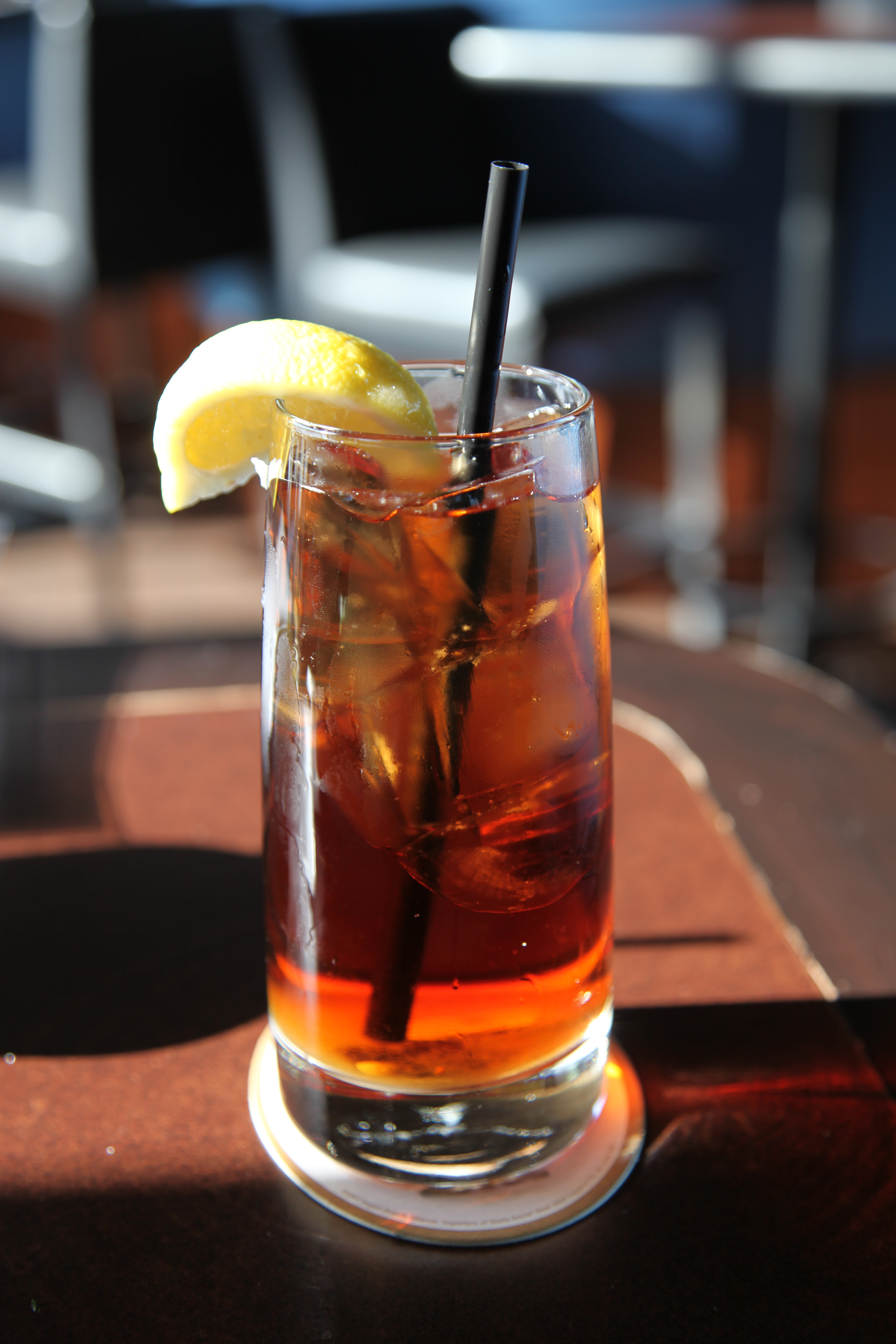
A glass of iced sweet tea with lemon

Sweet tea, also known as sweet iced tea, is a popular style of iced tea commonly consumed in the United States (especially the South). Sweet tea is most commonly made by adding sugar or simple syrup to black tea while the tea is either brewing or still hot, although artificial sweeteners are also frequently used. Sweet tea is almost always served ice cold. It may sometimes be flavored, most commonly with lemon but also with peach, raspberry, or mint. The drink is sometimes tempered with baking soda to reduce its acidity. Although sweet tea may be brewed with a lower sugar and calorie content than most fruit juices and sodas, it is not unusual to find sweet tea with a sugar level as high as 22 degrees Brix, or 22 g per 100 g of liquid, a level twice that of Coca-Cola.

Sweet tea is regarded as an important regional staple in the cuisine of the Southern United States and Indonesia. The availability of sweet tea in restaurants and other establishments is popularly used as an indicator to gauge whether an area can be considered part of the South.

== History ==
=== United States ===
Sweet tea began as an item of luxury due to the expensive nature of its basic ingredients: tea, ice, and sugar. Ice was possibly the most valued of the ingredients since it had to be shipped from afar at a time when access to cool drinking water was already a relative luxury. In modern times, sweet tea can be made in large quantities quickly and inexpensively.

The oldest known recipe for sweet tea was published in a community cookbook called Housekeeping in Old Virginia (copyright 1878) by Marion Cabell Tyree. The recipe called for green tea, since most sweet tea consumed during this period was green tea. However, during World War II, the major sources of green tea were cut off from the United States due to the Japanese invasion and occupation of green tea–producing regions. As an alternative, green tea was replaced with black tea from British India. By the end of World War II, black tea had become the tea most drunk by Americans.

In 2003, supposedly as an April Fool's joke, the Georgia State House of Representatives introduced a bill making it a "...misdemeanor of a high and aggravated nature" to sell iced tea in a restaurant that did not also offer sweet iced tea on the menu. The bill never went to a vote.

=== Indonesia ===
Tea drinking in Indonesia began during the Dutch colonial rule. In the 17th century, the Dutch brought tea plants to Batavia via Sukabumi Beach. Tea plants were subsequently planted in Indonesia which were suitable to West Java. At the same time, in Central Java, sugar cane cultivation was successfully introduced. The ready availability of the two ingredients led to development of sweet tea, which remains the most popular beverage in the country.

== Records ==
=== 2010 ===
The first recorded record regarding sweet tea was held by Chick-Fil-A. The corporation created the largest cup of sweet tea with 912 gallons of tea.

=== 2015 ===
The small town of Summerville, South Carolina took over the record for largest sweet tea at 1,452 gallons.

Months later, the company Lipton took over this record with 2,204 gallons of sweet tea.

=== 2016 ===
On National Tea Day, Summerville took back the record, making and containing 2,524 gallons of sweet tea.

== See also ==
- Amacha (lit. 'sweet tea'), a Japanese drink
- Tortuga (cocktail)

== Bibliography ==
- History of Iced Tea and Sweet Tea
- Housekeeping in Old Virginia by Marion Cabell Tyree. ISBN 1-4101-0508-3
- A Slate article on sweet tea
