= Beltsville Small White =

American breed of turkey

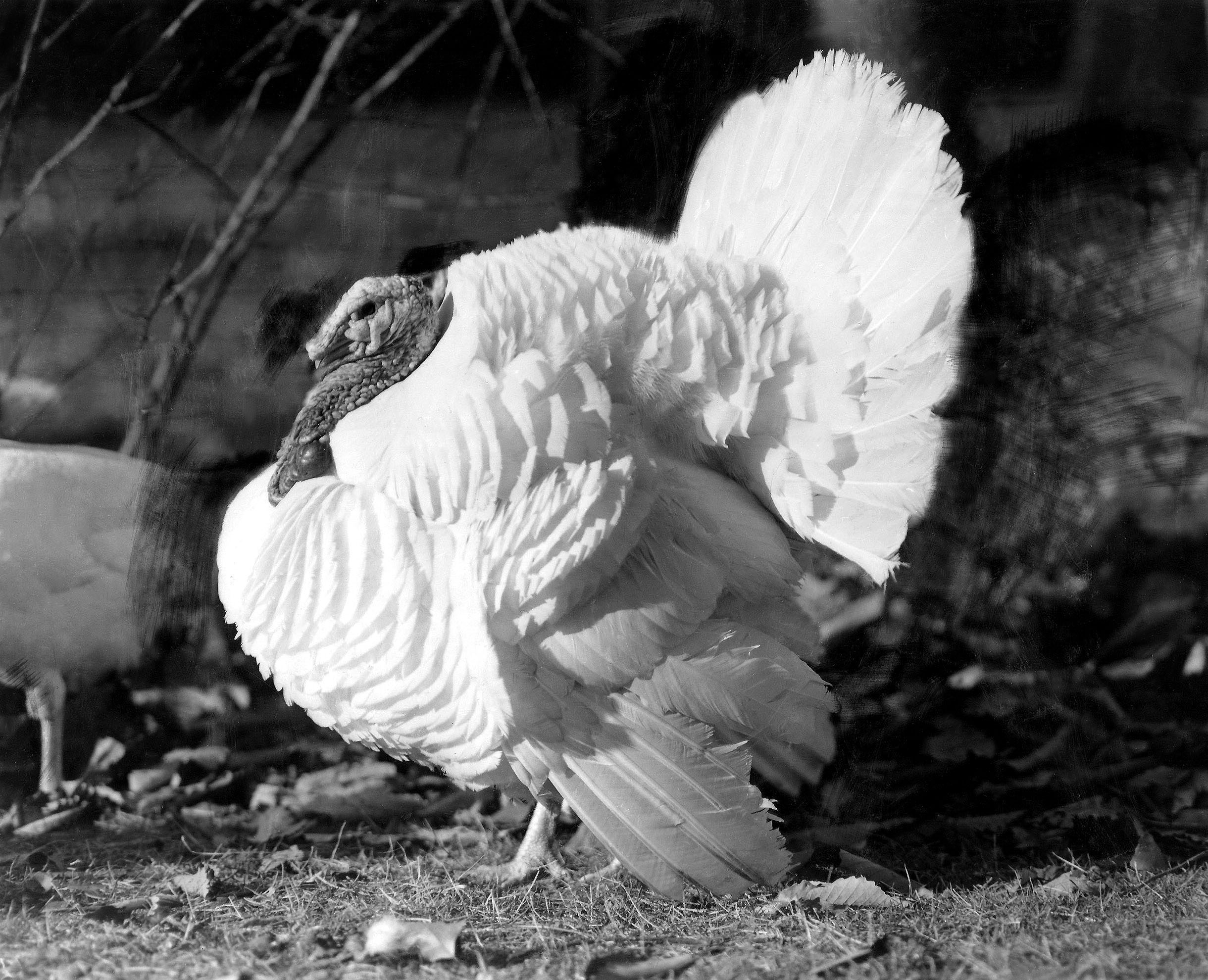
- A historic photo of a Beltsville Small White breed turkey.
- Conservation status: DAD-IS (2023): at risk/endangered; Livestock Conservancy (2023): critical
- Country of origin: United States
- Distribution: Canada; United States
- Use: meat

Traits
- Weight: Male: 17–21 lb (7.7–9.5 kg); Female: 10–17 lb (4.5–7.7 kg)
- Skin color: white
- Egg color: pale buff with reddish-brown spots

Classification
- APA: American
- PCGB: Light: White
- Domestic turkey; Meleagris gallopavo domesticus

The Beltsville Small White is a modern American breed of domestic turkey. It was developed from 1934 at the Beltsville Agricultural Research Center of the United States Department of Agriculture in Beltsville, Maryland, and was named for that town and for its physical characteristics — small size and white plumage. It enjoyed a brief period of commercial success in the mid-twentieth century, but numbers then declined sharply; in the twenty-first century it is an endangered breed, and may be considered a heritage turkey breed.

== History ==
Development for the Small White began in the 1930s in response to market research that said consumers wanted a turkey of small to medium size with no dark pinfeathers and more white meat. In 1934, the Beltsville Research Center started a seven-year breeding and research program; led by Stanley J. Marsden and lasting until 1941. Initially, the Small White was a cross of the Bronze, White Holland, White Austrian, Black, and wild turkeys. Two years later, the Broad Breasted Bronze was introduced as well. The new breed was characterized by early maturity, more breast meat, high hatchability, and an adequate size for smaller ovens and families. The breed was used commercially in the 1940s and was recognized officially by the American Poultry Association in 1951. Commercial production of Small Whites began in 1947 and increased to about 28 percent (or 19,000,000 of 67,693,000) of turkeys produced in 1954. However, in the following years, production slowly declined in favor of larger white strains to about 9 percent (9,000,000 of 93,370,000) of turkeys raised in 1963. In 1964, light breed turkeys (presumed to be Beltsville Whites or of similar breeding) saw a slight increase to 11 percent, but in the following years, saw a continued decline.

Since the Beltsville Small white was explicitly developed for smaller households and was less than ideal for commercial food processors and restaurants, the broader demand market shifted toward the much larger Broad Breasted White turkey by the 1970s. Beltsville Small Whites are extremely rare today and are listed as Critical by the American Livestock Conservancy. In more recent years, the variety has seen a revival of interest specifically for those interested in heritage turkey breeds, including a research flock at Iowa State University and efforts to locate and conserve remnant flocks in the United States and Canada. However, the acquisition of Small Whites for home flocks remains rare.

== Characteristics ==
Small Whites have entirely white plumage, with a red to blueish-white head, black beard, horn-colored beak, and dark brown eyes. Their shanks and toes are typically pinkish white. Weights range from approximately 17 to 21 lb (7.7 to 9.5 kg) for toms, and about 10 to 17 lb (4.5 to 7.7 kg) for hens. The eggs vary from mid-brown to a pale cream color; they may show some spotting.
