= Norfolk Black =

British breed of turkey

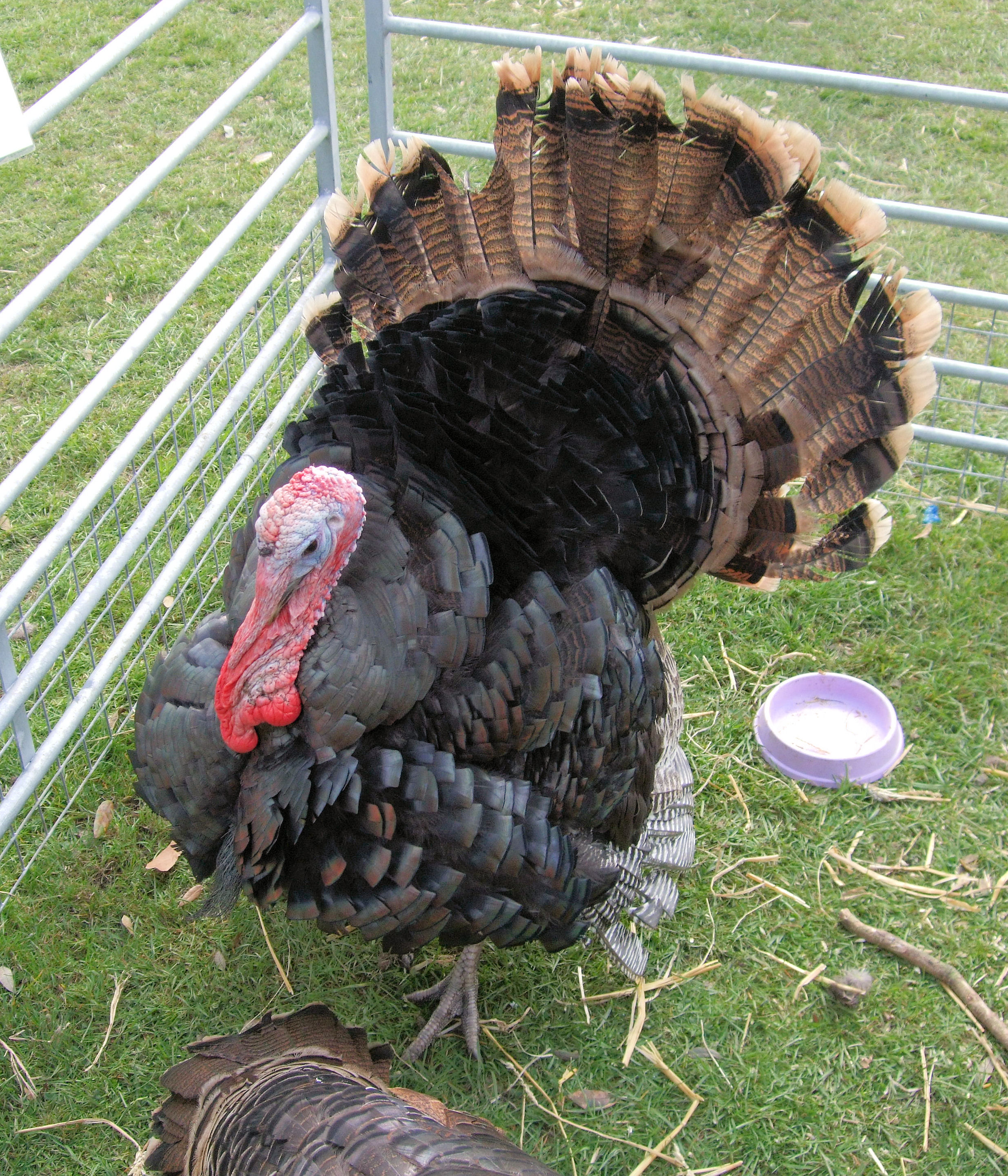
- A tom in Kew Gardens
- Conservation status: FAO (2007): endangered; DAD-IS (2021): unknown
- Other names: Black Spanish; Black Turkey; Black
- Country of origin: Europe, the county of Norfolk

Traits
- Weight: Male: 8.2–11.4 kg; Female: 5.0–6.8 kg

Classification
- APA: yes
- EE: yes
- PCGB: light turkey

The Norfolk Black, also known as the Black Spanish or Black Turkey, is a British breed of domestic turkey. It is thought to derive from birds taken to Britain from Spain, where they had arrived with Spanish explorers returning from the New World.

It is generally considered the oldest turkey breed in the United Kingdom.

== History ==
Turkeys were brought to Europe by early conquistadors returning from the New World, and were introduced to Britain – probably from Spain – in the early sixteenth century. According to the Chronicle of the Kings of England of Richard Baker of 1643, this was in the fifteenth year of the reign of Henry VIII, or about 1524. William Strickland is often credited with bringing them. Blackbirds had occasionally been seen among New World flocks of wild birds; European breeders selectively bred for this colour. In England, turkey farming was carried out mainly in East Anglia, particularly in Norfolk.

In the seventeenth or eighteenth century, early colonists travelling to the New World took black-coloured turkeys with them. Cross-breeding of some of these with Meleagris gallopavo silvestris, the Eastern sub-species of the wild turkey, led to the later development of the Bronze, Narragansett and Slate breeds. (Note: In the United States, the American Poultry Association regards these not as breeds but as colour variants of a single breed, the Turkey)

In the United Kingdom the breed was rescued from imminent disappearance in the 1930s. In 2026 its conservation status was listed by the Rare Breeds Survival Trust as 'priority' and in DAD-IS as 'unknown'; the last reported population data dates from 2002, when there were 1300 of the birds.

In the United States it was commercially farmed until the development of the Broad Breasted Bronze and Broad Breasted White in the early twentieth century. Fairly common in Europe, they are considered an endangered variety of heritage turkey today by the American Livestock Breeds Conservancy, A 1998 census conducted by the American Livestock Breeds Conservancy found that only 200 Black Spanish turkeys remained in the United States, which just 15 different breeders were raising. To help with conservation efforts, the Accokeek Foundation helped reintroduce this bird to the Potomac River tidewater region by sharing breeding stock with other historical museums and local farmers. A rafter of Black Spanish turkeys is currently being preserved by the Heritage Breed Livestock Conservation Program within the National Colonial Farm at Piscataway Park to increase public awareness of this threatened breed.
