= White Holland =

Breed of turkey

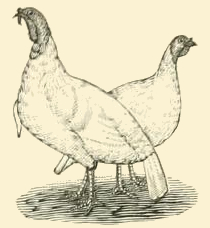
White Holland turkeys (Illustration from 1887)

The White Holland is an old variety of domestic turkey known for its white plumage. The White Holland, whose connection to the Netherlands is unsubstantiated, originated from crosses of white European turkeys (re)imported to North America and crossed with native birds. The White Holland was first recognized by the American Poultry Association in 1874, and today is considered a heritage turkey breed. The breed was crossed in the 1950s with the Broad Breasted Bronze to create the Broad Breasted White, which is now the most common turkey breed in the world. They were also the base for creating the also rare Beltsville Small White breed.

Standard weights are today 36 pounds for a tom and 20 for a hen. The Holland is currently listed as "threatened" by The Livestock Conservancy in the United States. The Standard of Perfection mostly now does not distinguish between White Holland and Broad Breasted White, though the White Holland is known for its hardiness, smaller breast, and shorter legs In Britain, the same has occurred, and all white turkeys may be described by breeders as "British White" birds.

== See also ==
- List of turkey breeds
