= National Thanksgiving Turkey Presentation =

Feast ritual held in the United States

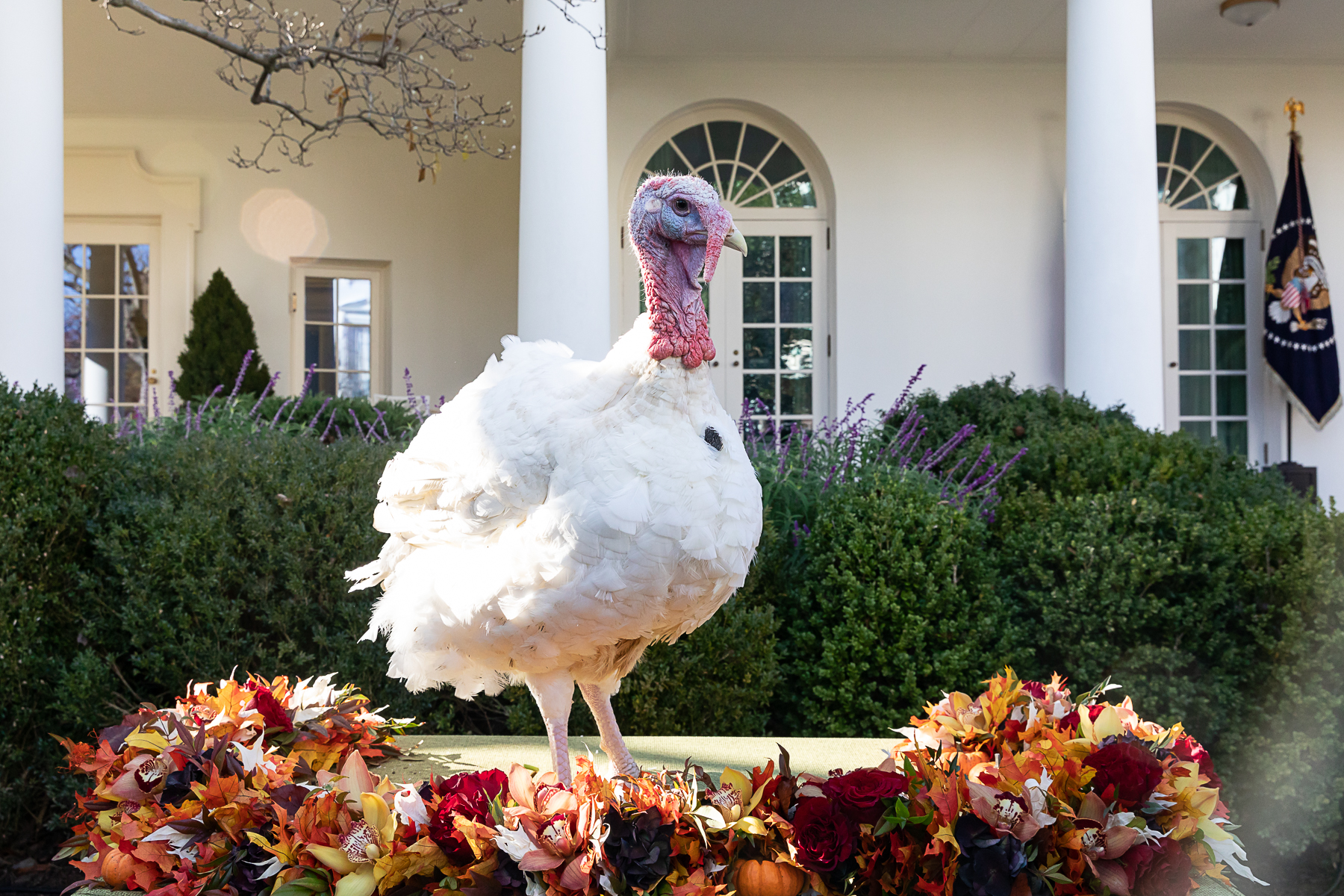
Peas, the turkey pardoned by President Donald Trump in 2018

The National Thanksgiving Turkey Presentation is a ceremony that takes place at the White House every year shortly before Thanksgiving. The president of the United States is presented with a live domestic turkey by the National Turkey Federation (NTF), usually a male of the Broad Breasted White variety. The early years also included a joint presentation with the Poultry and Egg National Board.

The ceremony dates back to the 1940s; these turkeys were usually slaughtered and eaten, with some exceptions, prior to the 1970s, when it became standard practice to spare the turkey. During the presidency of George H. W. Bush, it became a tradition. All presidents since Bush have issued a ceremonial "pardon" to the turkey, which spares the turkey from being served as Thanksgiving dinner and leads to the turkey being sent to live out its natural life at a park or university. It is a tradition that the turkeys be picked from the chairperson of the NTF's home state, occasionally from the chair's own farm.

== History ==
The tale of Abraham Lincoln pardoning his son Tad's Christmas turkey in 1863 appears to be apocryphal, as it only appeared in print after Lincoln was assassinated in 1865.

Turkeys had been donated to the president as gifts from private citizens since the 1870s. Horace Vose, a Rhode Island turkey farmer, presented a dressed turkey to the president each year from 1873 until his death in 1913. In 1913, South Trimble, a Kentucky farmer and Clerk of the United States House of Representatives, presented a turkey to then-president Woodrow Wilson that year, convinced that his red pepper-fed but smaller turkey tasted better than Vose's; no record survives of which turkey Wilson chose. This, along with Vose's death that December, set off a free-for-all in which numerous farmers tried to be the one to supply the annual holiday turkeys to the president. The rivalry escalated in the Roaring Twenties, with a group of women Warren G. Harding supporters from Chicago sending Harding turkeys (including in 1920 when he was still president-elect and at the Panama Canal Zone; the turkey was delivered by train), while Cuero, Texas, also sent Wilson and Harding turkeys. The Cuero turkeys were notable for being the first to be sent while still alive; the Wilson administration slaughtered and ate the bird. Calvin Coolidge, alarmed at the number of turkeys being offered to the president at the time, briefly stopped the tradition upon assuming office in 1923 and chose to buy his own turkey; he relented in 1925 and was soon bombarded with an unusual array of animals to eat, including Rebecca, a live raccoon that Coolidge received in 1926 and, unwilling to eat it, designated as a White House pet.

The official presentation of a turkey to the president each year began in 1947 under President Harry S. Truman. The presentation was partially born out of a lobbying campaign: the Truman administration, in an effort to conserve grain for foreign aid campaigns, began promoting "Meatless Tuesdays" and "Poultryless Thursdays" in the autumn of 1947. Not only did American citizens quickly grow frustrated with the (voluntary, but strongly encouraged) restrictions and begin disregarding them in short order, the National Poultry and Egg Board, incensed at the attack on their industry, noted that not only was Thanksgiving on a Thursday, but Christmas and New Year's Day also landed on a Thursday that year. A truce was called in the dispute in early November, before the Thanksgiving holiday, but "Eggless Thursdays" continued to be promoted for the rest of the year, meaning that dishes such as pumpkin pie, another Thanksgiving staple, were still on the forbidden foods list. Records on file at the Truman Library show that Truman admitted eating at least some of the turkeys.

The Eisenhower Presidential Library says documents in their collection reveal that President Dwight Eisenhower ate the birds presented to him during his two terms. President John F. Kennedy spontaneously spared a turkey on November 19, 1963, just three days before his assassination. The bird was wearing a sign reading, "Good Eating Mr. President". Kennedy returned the massive 55-pound (25 kg) turkey to the farm, saying "we'll let this one grow." Scattered reports in The Washington Post and Los Angeles Times referred to it as a pardon, but Kennedy did not refer to it as such. Likewise, Richard Nixon also spared some of the turkeys given to him during his time as president. During the Carter administration, First Lady Rosalynn Carter arranged to have the turkeys sent to petting zoos, and no public ceremonies were held.

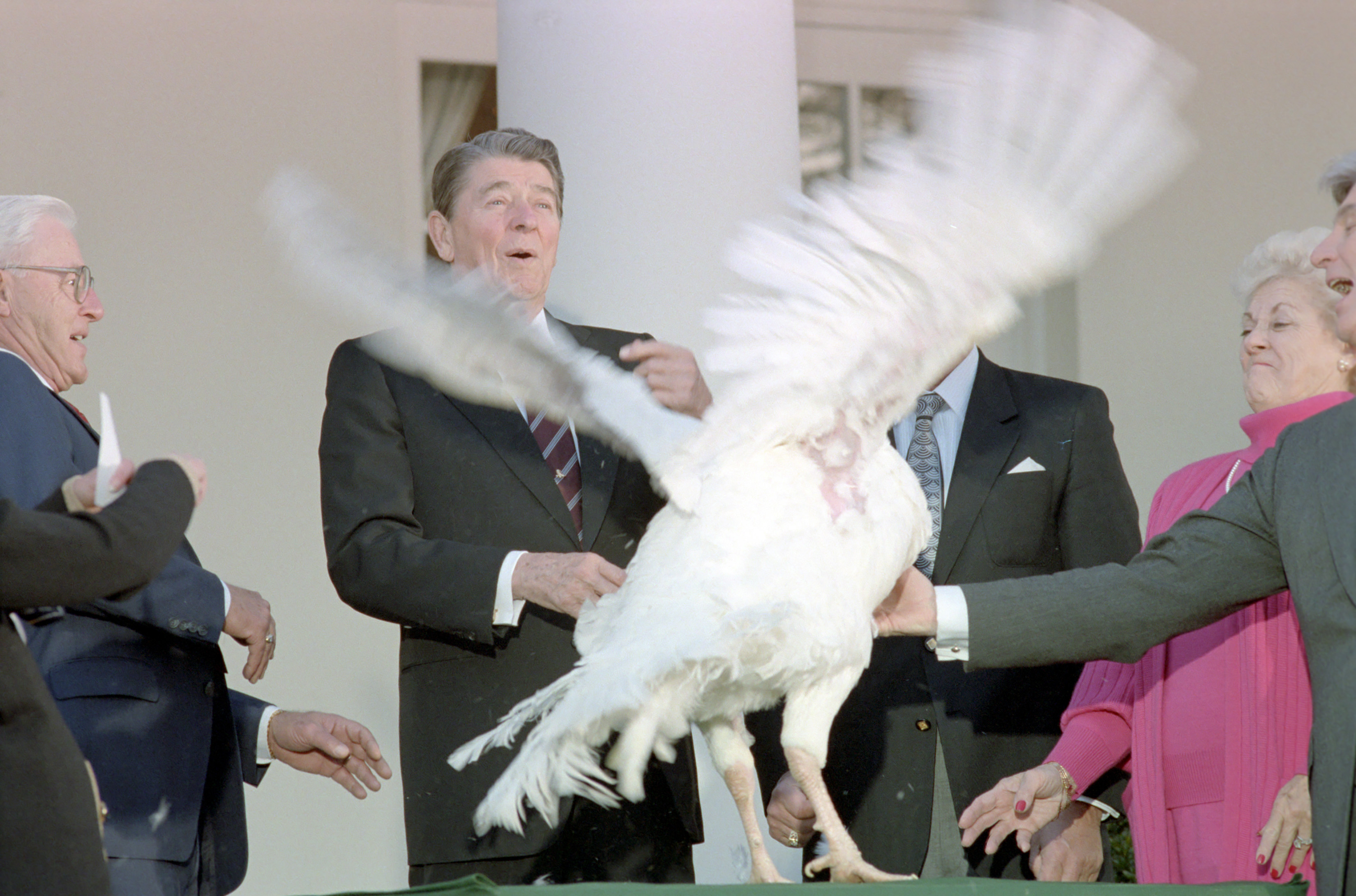
"If they'd given me a different answer on Charlie and his future, I would have pardoned him." ―Ronald Reagan, 1987.

The first president on record issuing a "pardon" to his turkey was Ronald Reagan. Reagan had been sending the turkeys presented to him to farms and zoos since at least 1982, and it was also under Reagan when those turkeys began receiving names, including 1984's "R. J." (for "Robust and Juicy"). 1987's turkey, Charlie, was likewise headed to a petting zoo. At the time, Reagan was facing questions over the Iran-Contra affair, on whether or not he would consider pardoning Oliver North (who had yet to be tried for his involvement in the affair); Reagan conjured the notion of the turkey pardon as a joke to deflect those questions. Reagan did not make any pardon references in the 1988 presentation, but his successor, George H. W. Bush, instituted the turkey pardon as a permanent part of the presentation beginning his first year in office, 1989. The phrase "presidential pardon" in that ceremony was apparently inserted by a speechwriter; Bush initially was indifferent to the terminology, saying "'Reprieve', 'keep him going', or 'pardon': it's all the same for the turkey, as long as he doesn't end up on the president's holiday table."

For many years the turkeys were sent to Frying Pan Farm Park in Fairfax County, Virginia. From 2005 to 2009, the pardoned turkeys were sent to either the Disneyland Resort in California or the Walt Disney World Resort in Florida, where they served as the honorary grand marshals of Disney's Thanksgiving Day Parade. In 2010, 2011 and 2012, the turkeys were sent to live at Mount Vernon, the estate and home of George Washington. However, as Washington never farmed turkeys, Mount Vernon stopped displaying and accepting the turkeys due to the fact that they violated the estate's policy of maintaining its own historical accuracy. The 2013, 2014 and 2015 turkeys were sent to Morven Park in Leesburg, Virginia, the estate of former Virginia governor (and prolific turkey farmer) Westmoreland Davis. Virginia Tech housed the turkeys from 2016 to 2019; Virginia Tech was chosen because of the college's poultry science program, and the National Turkey Federation wanted to begin a tradition of cooperation between the turkey industry and universities. After four successful years at Virginia Tech, the alma mater of the chairman of the NTF at the time, the federation chose to begin housing the turkeys at universities closer to the turkeys' home towns. The 2020 turkeys were sent to be housed at Iowa State University, the 2021 turkeys reside at Purdue University, the 2022 and 2025 turkeys live at North Carolina State University. and the 2023 turkeys are housed at the University of Minnesota. Turkeys pardoned in 2024 were sent to the Minnesota Agricultural Interpretive Center in Waseca, Minnesota and Texas Agricultural and Mechanical University will receive the 2026 turkeys.

== Selection process ==
The turkeys are raised in the same fashion as turkeys designated for slaughter and are fed a grain-heavy diet of fortified corn and soybeans to increase the birds' size. A flock of between 50 and 80 birds, typically from the farm of the current National Turkey Federation chairperson and hatched in early summer, are selected to be acclimated to handle loud noises, flash photography and large crowds; in late October or early November, the 10 to 20 best-preened and best-behaved of that flock are chosen and eventually narrowed down to two finalists, whose names are chosen by the White House staff from suggestions by school children from the state where they were raised. The two finalists are then transported to Washington, where they stay at the Willard InterContinental Washington Hotel at National Turkey Federation expense before being pardoned in a ceremony at the White House. Turkey hens are usually marketed at 14 weeks and weigh 15.5 pounds (7.0 kg) when killed. This compares to the tom, which takes 18 weeks to reach a market weight of 38 pounds (17 kg). The turkeys for the National Thanksgiving Turkey Presentation are usually between 17 and 21 week-old toms (males) weighing 45 pounds (20 kg) by the time of their White House visit, compared to the shorter growing period for turkeys destined for market.

Broad Breasted White turkeys are bred for large size, are sedentary animals and have a predilection for overeating, making them prone to health problems associated with obesity such as heart disease, respiratory failure, joint damage and reduced life spans compared to wild or heritage turkeys. For many years, the pardoned turkeys were documented to have very short lives after their pardoning, frequently dying within a year of being pardoned; for comparison, heritage turkey breeds have lifespans on par with those of wild turkeys, at least five years. The lifespans of the pardoned turkeys have steadily improved in recent years, frequently having lifespans of over two years and occasionally reaching three years of age, an improvement attributed to better choices of homes after the pardons; rather than serving solely as tourist attractions, the turkeys are now placed in the care of experts who make conscious efforts to maintain the turkeys' health for as long as possible.

== List of turkeys pardoned ==
President Barack Obama grants the traditional turkey pardon to Liberty during the ceremony at the North Portico of the White House on November 23, 2011. Liberty was one of the few to survive more than a year after being pardoned.

=== Reagan presidency ===
- 1987: "Charlie", was sent to a petting zoo in 1987 and humorously referred to as pardoned.
- 1988: "Woody", a National Turkey Federation turkey raised in Story City, Iowa

=== George H. W. Bush presidency ===
- 1989: The first turkey is officially pardoned during the presentation.

=== Clinton presidency ===
- 1993: An unnamed turkey provided by Jennie-O in Willmar, Minnesota.
- 1994: Tom, a 50-pound (23 kg) turkey from Harrisonburg, Virginia.
- 1995: An unnamed 75-pound (34 kg) white turkey with a patriotic red, white, and blue appearance, raised at California State University, Fresno in Fresno, California.
- 1996: Carl, a 35-pound (16 kg) turkey.
- 1997: An unnamed 60-pound (27 kg) turkey from Raeford, North Carolina.
- 1998: An unnamed 45-pound (20 kg) turkey.
- 1999: "Harry the Turkey".
- 2000: "Jerry the Turkey", a 45-pound (20 kg) bird from Barron, Wisconsin. The pardoned turkey (the eighth in Clinton's presidency) and its unnamed alternate were both sent to Kidwell Farm's petting zoo in Herndon, Virginia.

=== George W. Bush presidency ===
- 2001: Liberty and his back-up Freedom, so named in the wake of the September 11th attacks. They weighed 48 and 52 pounds (22 and 24 kg), respectively.
- 2002: Katie, the first-ever female turkey pardoned. The 30-pound (14 kg) bird was bred by Ron Prestage, chairman of the National Turkey Federation, as well as alternate bird Zack. The turkeys were named after Prestage's children.
- 2003: Stars and backup Stripes.
- 2004: Biscuits and backup Gravy, from West Virginia.
- 2005: Marshmallow and alternate bird Yam, raised in Henning, Minnesota. Beginning in 2005 pardoned birds were sent to Disneyland to live, and serve as the "honorary grand marshal" of that year's Thanksgiving's Day parade, following concerns raised by animal rights groups that the birds had not survived for long. For the previous 15 years they had been sent to Frying Pan Farm Park near Herndon, Virginia. Names were generally chosen in online votes taken at the White House website.
- 2006: Flyer and alternate bird Fryer, raised in Missouri.
- 2007: 45-pound (20 kg) May and backup Flower, raised in Indiana.
- 2008: 45-pound (20 kg) backup "vice" turkey named Pumpkin, after the number one turkey Pecan fell ill the night before the ceremony. Both turkeys were allowed to live.

=== Obama presidency ===
- 2009: Courage, a 45-pound turkey provided by the National Turkey Federation, and alternate bird Carolina, raised in North Carolina. Passing away in 2016, Courage lived to be over 6 years of age, an unusual feat for any turkey but especially commercial breeds. A spokesperson for Disneyland, where Courage was sent to spend his remaining years, credits his long life to changing the bird's diet from the typical soy- and corn-heavy feed of commercial farms to a more balanced natural diet, allowing him to lose much of the excess weight that causes strain to both the limbs and organs of these birds.
- 2010: Apple, a 45-pound turkey from Foster Farms in Modesto, California; and alternate bird Cider. Both had died of natural causes by Thanksgiving 2011.
- 2011: A 45-pound turkey named Liberty and an alternate bird named Peace, both of which were raised in Willmar, Minnesota. Peace survived until shortly before Thanksgiving 2012, when he was euthanized. Liberty survived until being euthanized April 26, 2013 at the age of 2.
- 2012: Cobbler and Gobbler, both 40-pound (18 kg) turkeys from Rockingham County, Virginia. Gobbler died suddenly in February 2013; Cobbler was euthanized on August 22 of that year.
- 2013: Popcorn, a 38-pound (17 kg) turkey from Badger, Minnesota. Popcorn won an online contest over its identically sized stablemate Caramel, which was also spared. Popcorn died of heatstroke in summer 2014. Caramel survived much longer; it outlived one of the next year's turkeys and did not die until October 2015, spending most of its two years of life at Morven Park as the companion of a brown heritage turkey named Franklin.
- 2014: Cheese and alternate bird Mac, both of which were 48-pound (22 kg) turkeys from Fort Recovery, Ohio. Mac died of suspected heatstroke in July 2015; Cheese remained alive as of November 2015, with the surviving Franklin as its companion. Cheese was implied dead some time before November 2017, as the Morven Park website mentioned only housing the 2015 turkeys by that time.
- 2015: Abe, a 43 pounds (20 kg) turkey again presented by Foster Farms. The alternate was 42 pounds (19 kg) Honest. Morven Park reported that both were still alive as of November 2016 and were still listed as alive on Morven Park's Web site in November 2017. In 2018, Morven Park's website mentioned the final departure of the 2015 pardoned turkeys happening in December 2017; by January 2019, they had removed all mention of them on their Turkey Hill Farm page.
- 2016: Tater and Tot, 40-pound and 39½-pound (18 kg respectively) turkeys from Storm Lake, Iowa. Both were reported as still alive and healthy but showing signs of old age as of November 2017. The birds died some time before November 2018; Tater was later revealed to have been euthanized for a leg problem at age 2 1/2.

=== First Trump presidency ===
- 2017: Drumstick, a 36-pound (16 kg) turkey, who was chosen over alternate Wishbone, a 47-pound (21 kg) turkey; both were from Alexandria, Minnesota. There are conflicting reports regarding the fate of the turkeys: Fox News claimed both turkeys were still alive and living a "lavish life" as of November 2018, while The Guardian claimed that both were dead. CNN confirmed that both had died by November 2019. Two pre-slaughtered turkeys from Orefield, Pennsylvania, were also presented, with those turkeys being donated to the non-profit Martha's Table.
- 2018: Peas, a 39-pound (18 kg) turkey with a height of 30", chosen over Carrots, a 41-pound (19 kg) turkey with a height of 32", both from Huron, South Dakota, were pardoned in 2018. Both were hatched on June 28, 2018. Both Peas and Carrots were still alive as late as 2021.
- 2019: Butter, a 47-pound (21 kg) turkey with a height of 31", chosen over Bread, a 45-pound (20 kg) turkey with a height of 32". Both were from Butterball contract farmer Wellie Jackson of Clinton, North Carolina. The pre-slaughtered turkeys again came from Orefield, Pennsylvania. Both Bread and Butter were still alive in 2021.
- 2020: Corn, chosen over Cob, owned by Ron and Susie Kardel of West Liberty Foods in West Liberty, Iowa. Both were still alive in November 2021.

=== Biden presidency ===
- 2021: Peanut Butter and Jelly, both 40-pound (18 kg) turkeys raised by Andrea Welp of Jasper, Indiana. As of November 2022, both were still alive, with Purdue stating that the birds had made a "smooth adjustment" to retirement.
- 2022: Chocolate, a 46-pound (21 kg) turkey, chosen along with Chip, a 47-pound (21 kg) turkey, both raised by NTF chairman Ronnie Parker at Circle S Ranch in Monroe, North Carolina. Both are still alive as of August 2024.
- 2023: Liberty, a 42.5-pound (19.3 kg) turkey, along with Bell, a 42.1 pounds (19.1 kg) turkey, both from a Jennie-O owned-and-operated farm in Willmar, Minnesota.
- 2024: Peach and Blossom, 41-pound (19 kg) and 40-pound (18 kg) turkeys from the independent farm of NTF chairman John Zimmerman of Northfield, Minnesota. Both were reported as alive and well, though gaining substantial weight (50 and 60 pounds), in November 2025. In October 2026, Farmamerica implied that Peach had died some time in the previous year, as by then, it was housing only Blossom.

=== Second Trump presidency ===
- 2025: Gobble and Waddle, 52-pound (24 kg) and 50-pound (23 kg) turkeys from Wayne County, North Carolina.
- 2026: Two turkeys raised by Scott and Becky Rightsell of Deans Gap Farm in Pendleton County, West Virginia.

== State ceremonies ==
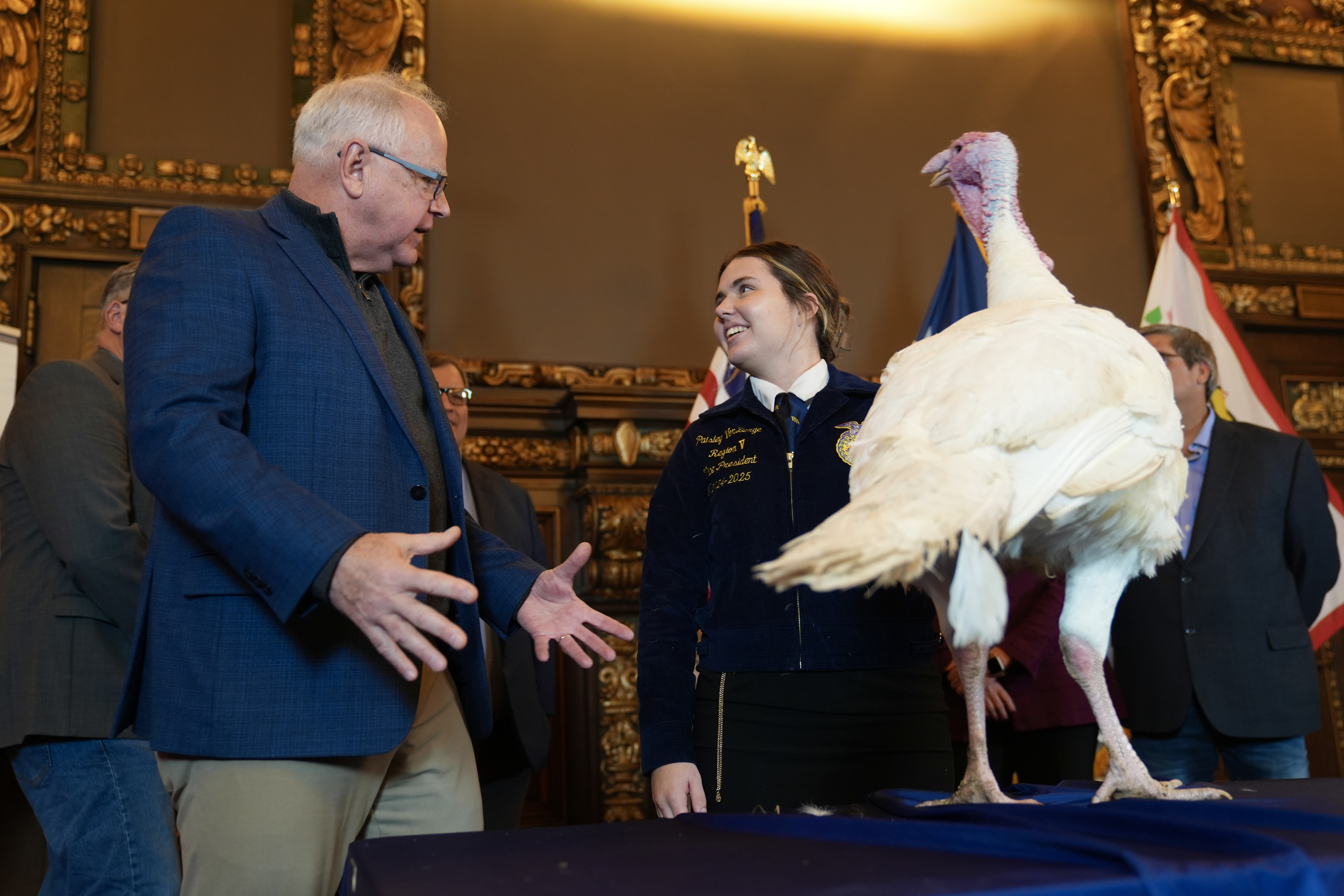
A turkey is presented to Tim Walz from Paisley VonBerge, the 2025–26 Minnesota FFA State Vice President, at Minnesota's 2024 turkey presentation. Minnesota turkeys are traditionally not pardoned.

A number of U.S. states have similar turkey presentation events. Minnesota holds a Thanksgiving turkey ceremony; that state usually does not issue a pardon. The pardoning ceremonies have also been extended to other holidays; for instance, Erie County, New York's county executive once facetiously pardoned a butter lamb during Holy Week.

== Criticism ==
The "pardoning" of turkey during the National Thanksgiving Turkey Presentation has been cited as an illustration of carnism. Animal rights scholars cite this as an illustration of dissonance reduction, which is the prominence given to all similar "saved from slaughter" stories, in which the media focus on one animal that evaded slaughter, while ignoring the millions that did not. According to Melanie Joy, this dichotomy is characteristic of carnism. Animals at the center of such narratives include Wilbur in Charlotte's Web (1952); the eponymous and fictional star of Babe (1995); Christopher Hogwood in Sy Montgomery's The Good, Good Pig (2006); the Tamworth Two; Emily the Cow; and Cincinnati Freedom. A 2012 study found that most media reporting on the turkey-pardoning ceremony celebrated the poultry industry while marginalizing the link between living animals and meat.

Lobbyists in Minnesota have forbidden the governor of that state from pardoning the turkeys presented to the governor since the early 2000s, instead processing those turkeys as usual and sending them to a needy family, under the premise that the creatures are raised specifically as livestock for their meat and are not meant to live beyond that. In a 2019 statement, the Minnesota Poultry Growers Association stated "In order to not have a cross message that we're pardoning them and they're pets (...) we don't raise the turkeys to be pardoned." Former Minnesota Governor Mark Dayton implied that he had been threatened by industry attorneys: "Every time I exceed my executive authority, somebody files a lawsuit."

== Popular culture ==
In The West Wing episode "Shibboleth," when C.J. Cregg learns the alternate turkey is to be slaughtered, she appeals to President Jed Bartlet to save it. He points out that he cannot pardon a turkey, as it had committed no crime and he has no "judicial jurisdiction over birds". So, he drafts the turkey into military service to spare its life. In real life, both the turkey and the alternate are spared.

The animated film Free Birds centers around a turkey who was pardoned, then is recruited to go back in time to the first Thanksgiving to prevent turkeys from being associated with the holiday.

In David Mamet's play November, an incumbent president losing his bid for reelection uses the yearly tradition to extort the turkey farmers to add to his lacking campaign fund.

In the Rick and Morty episode "Rick & Morty's Thanksploitation Spectacular", Rick turns himself into a turkey in an effort to receive a presidential pardon from President Curtis.

== Gallery ==
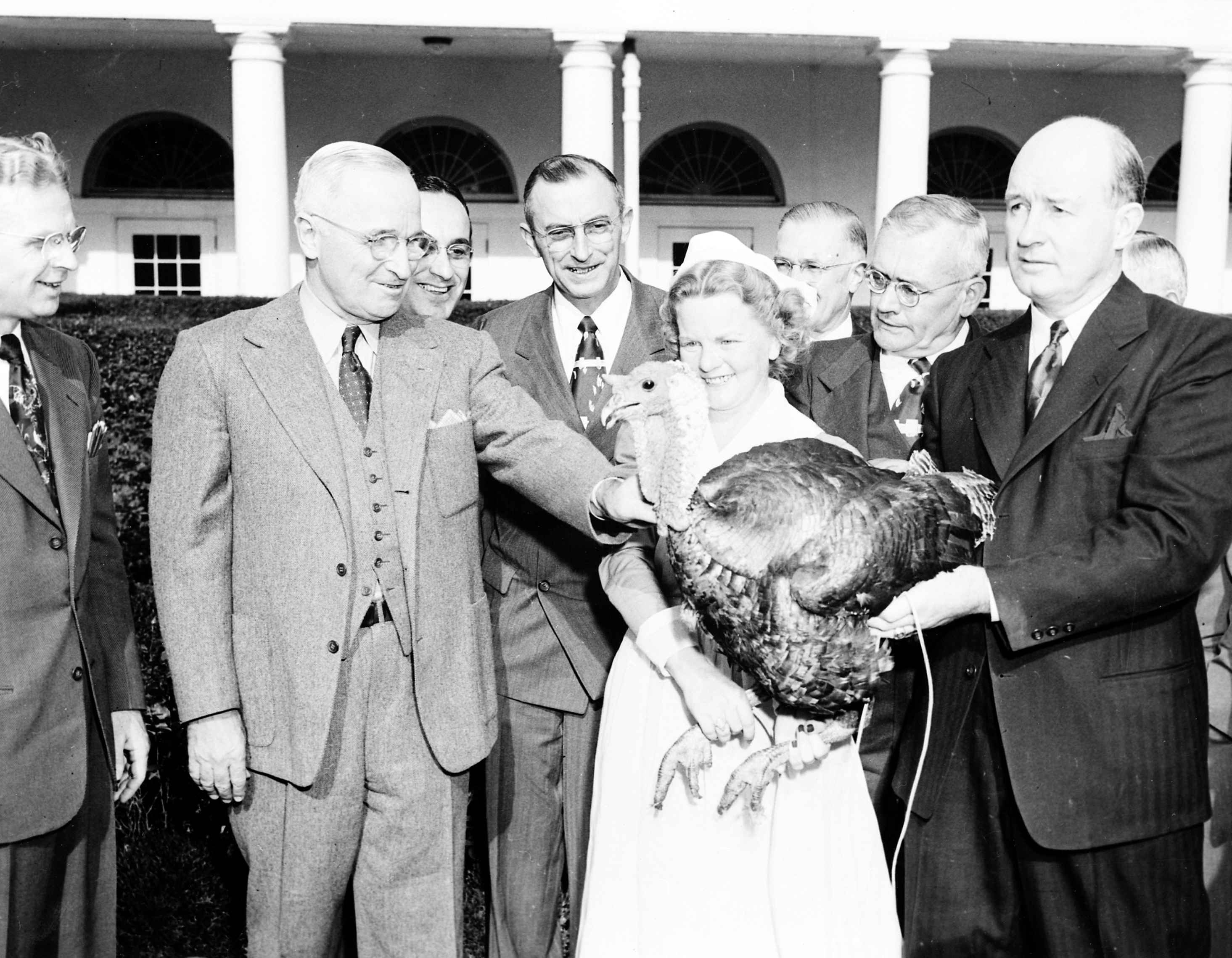
President Harry Truman accepting a turkey (this one a Bronze) from the turkey industry, 1949

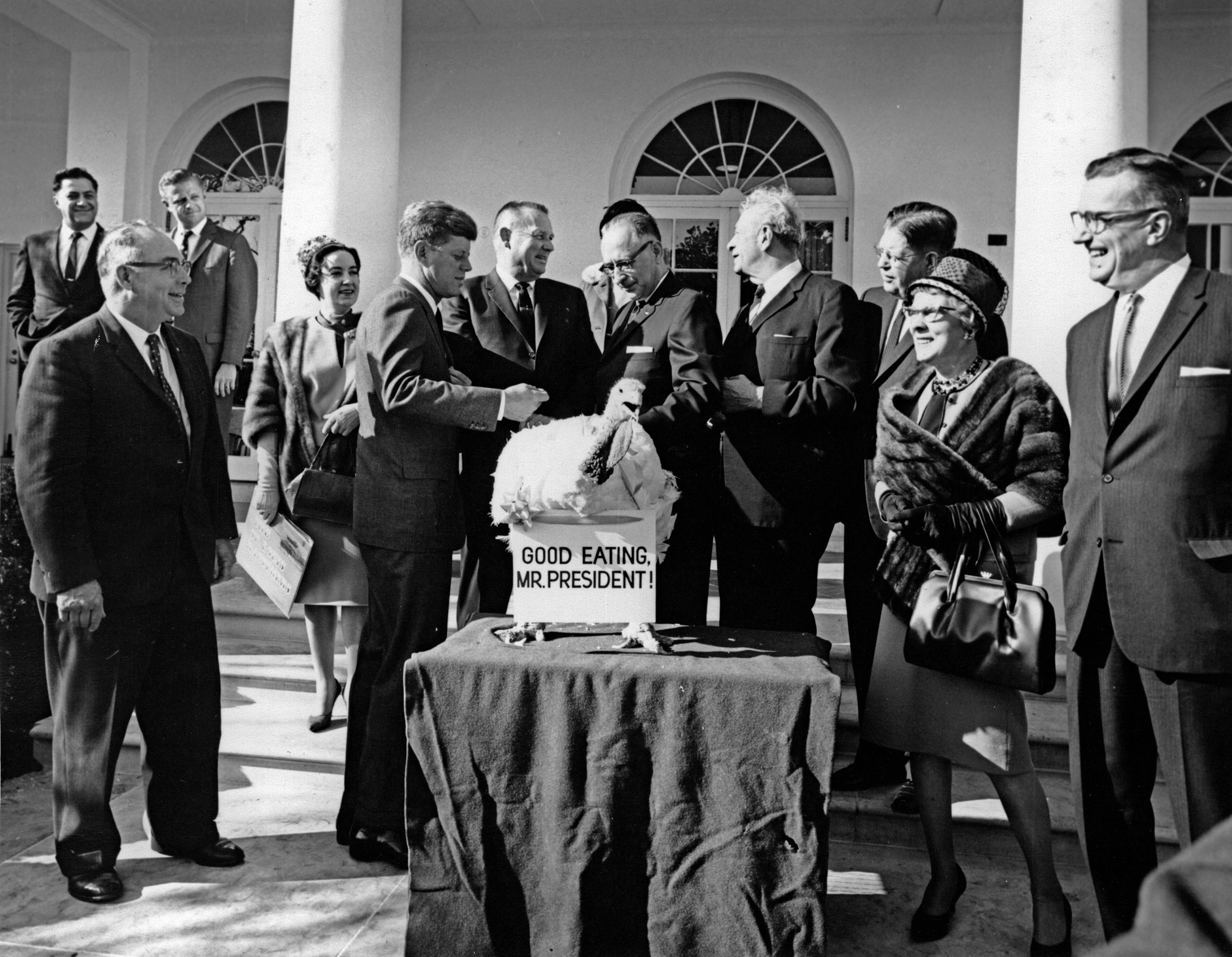
President John F. Kennedy sparing a turkey, 1963, only three days before his assassination

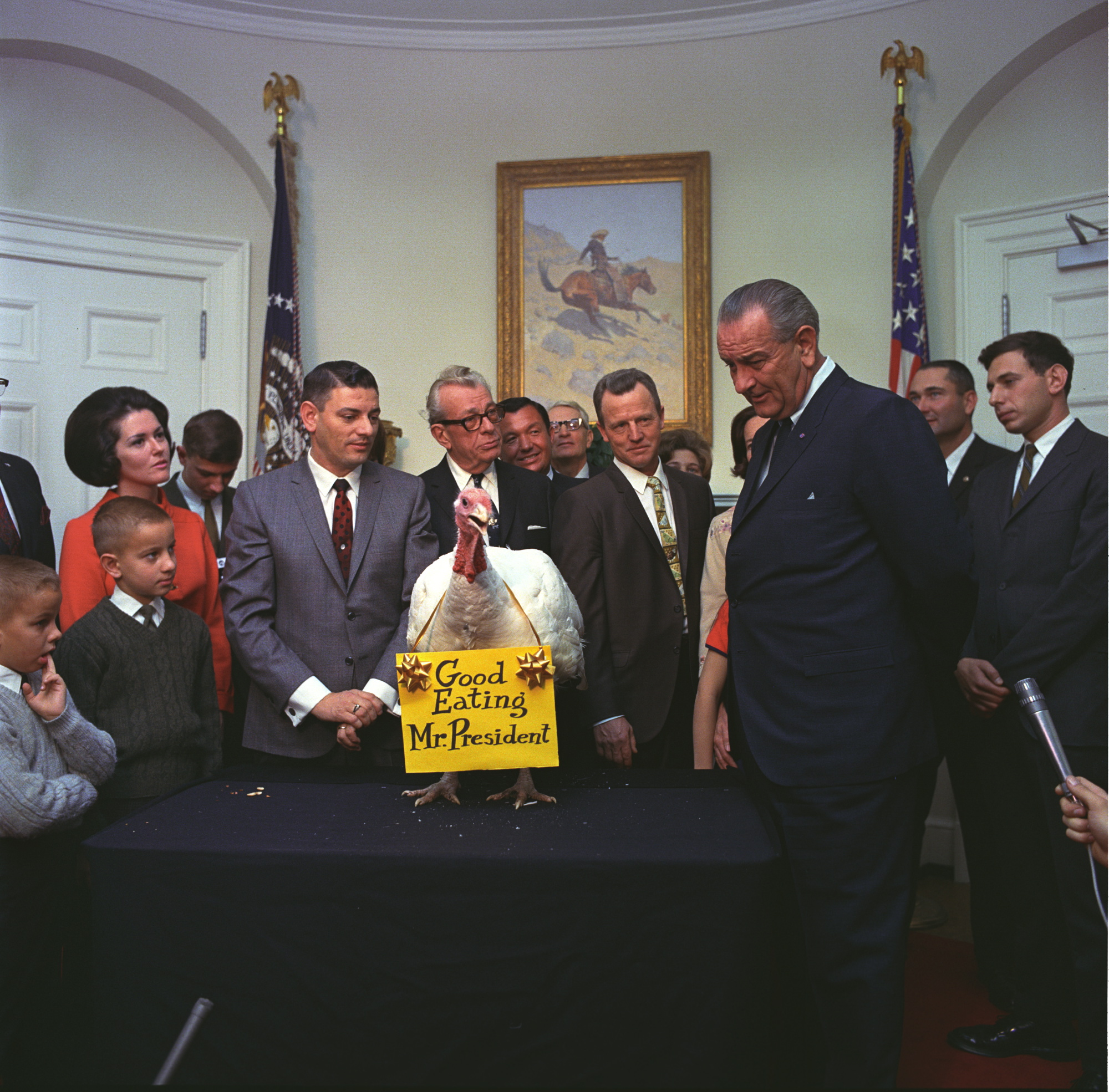
President Lyndon Johnson accepting a non-pardoned turkey, 1967

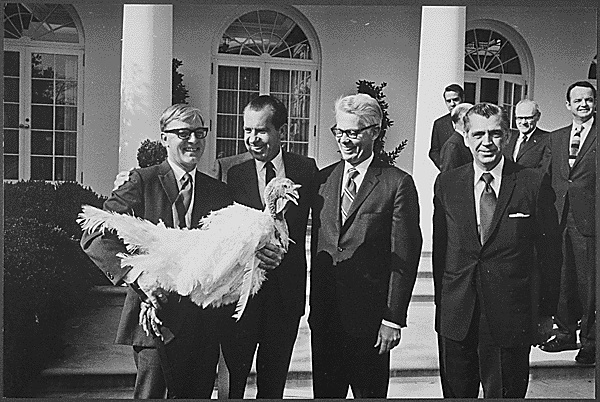
President Richard Nixon sparing a turkey, 1971

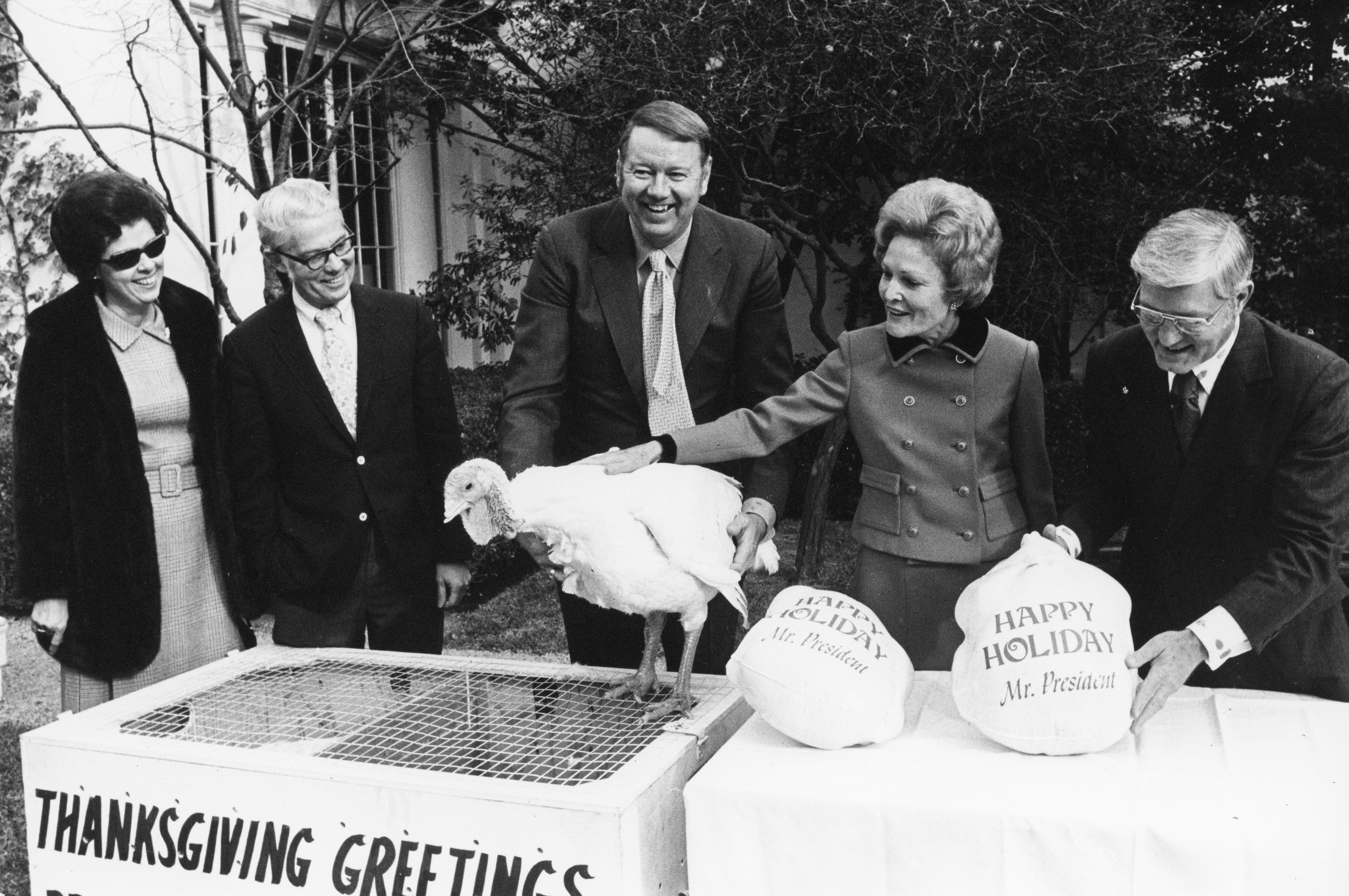
First Lady Pat Nixon accepting a turkey on behalf of her husband, 1973

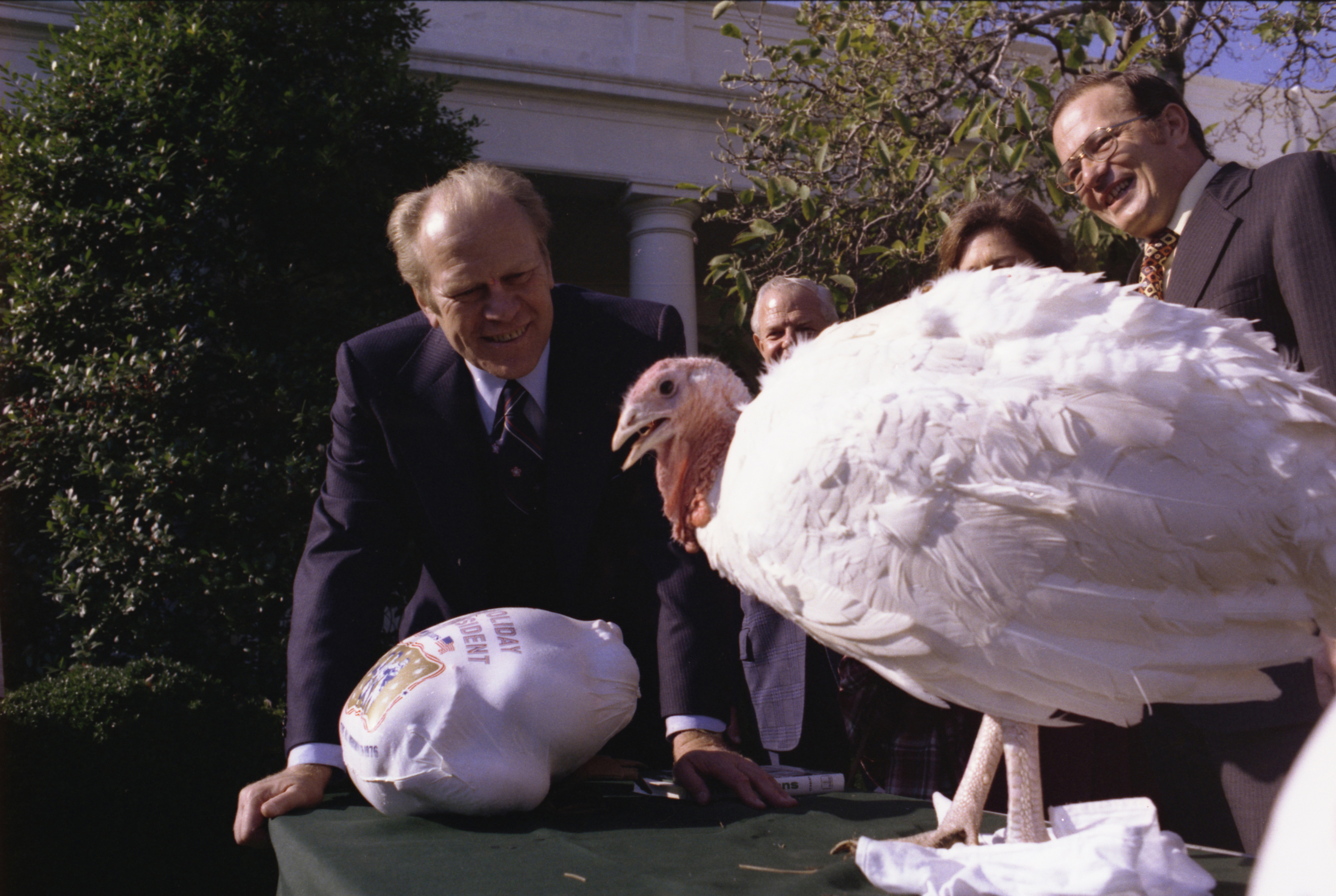
President Gerald Ford accepting a non-pardoned turkey, 1975

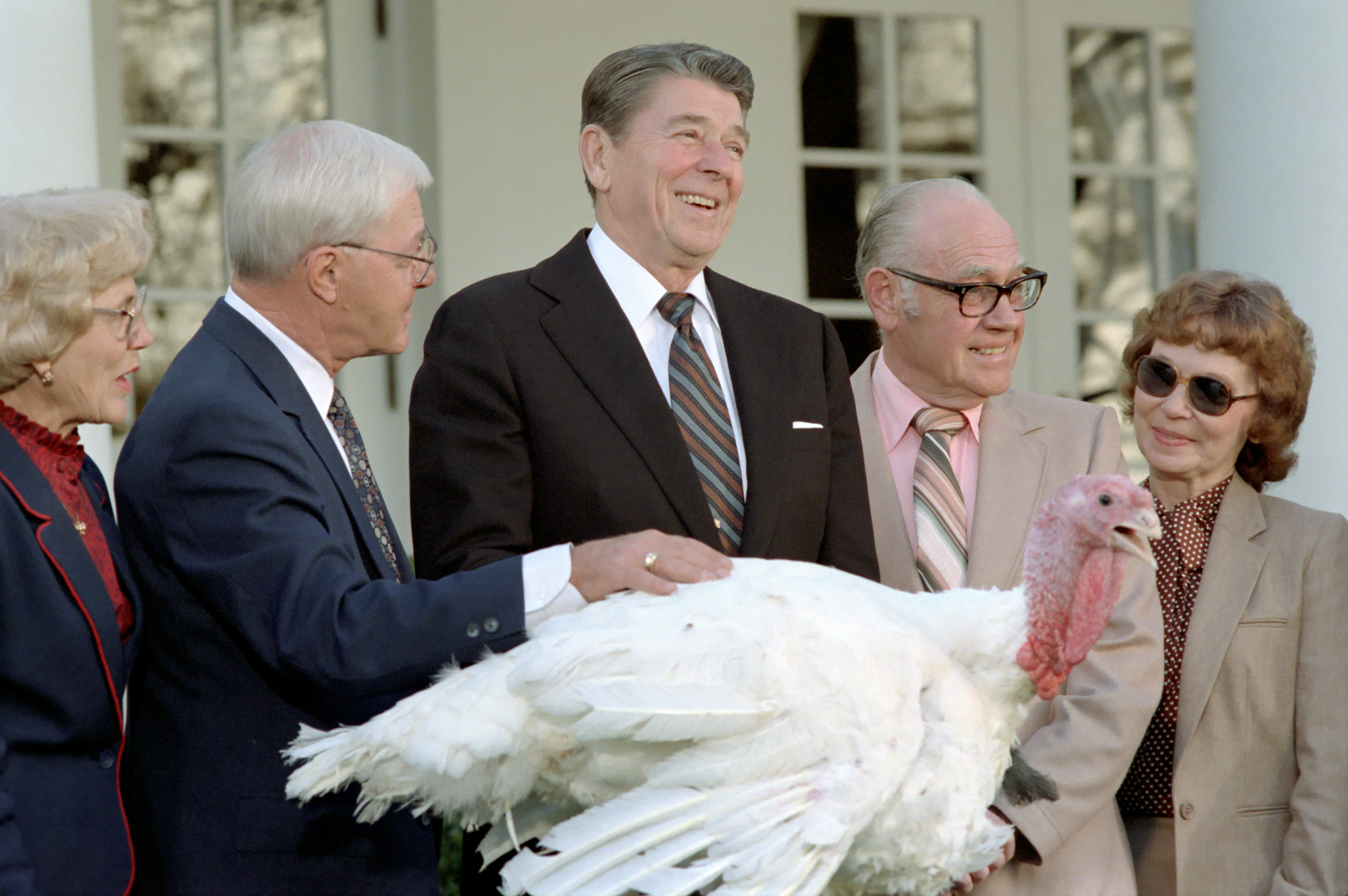
President Ronald Reagan sparing a turkey, 1983

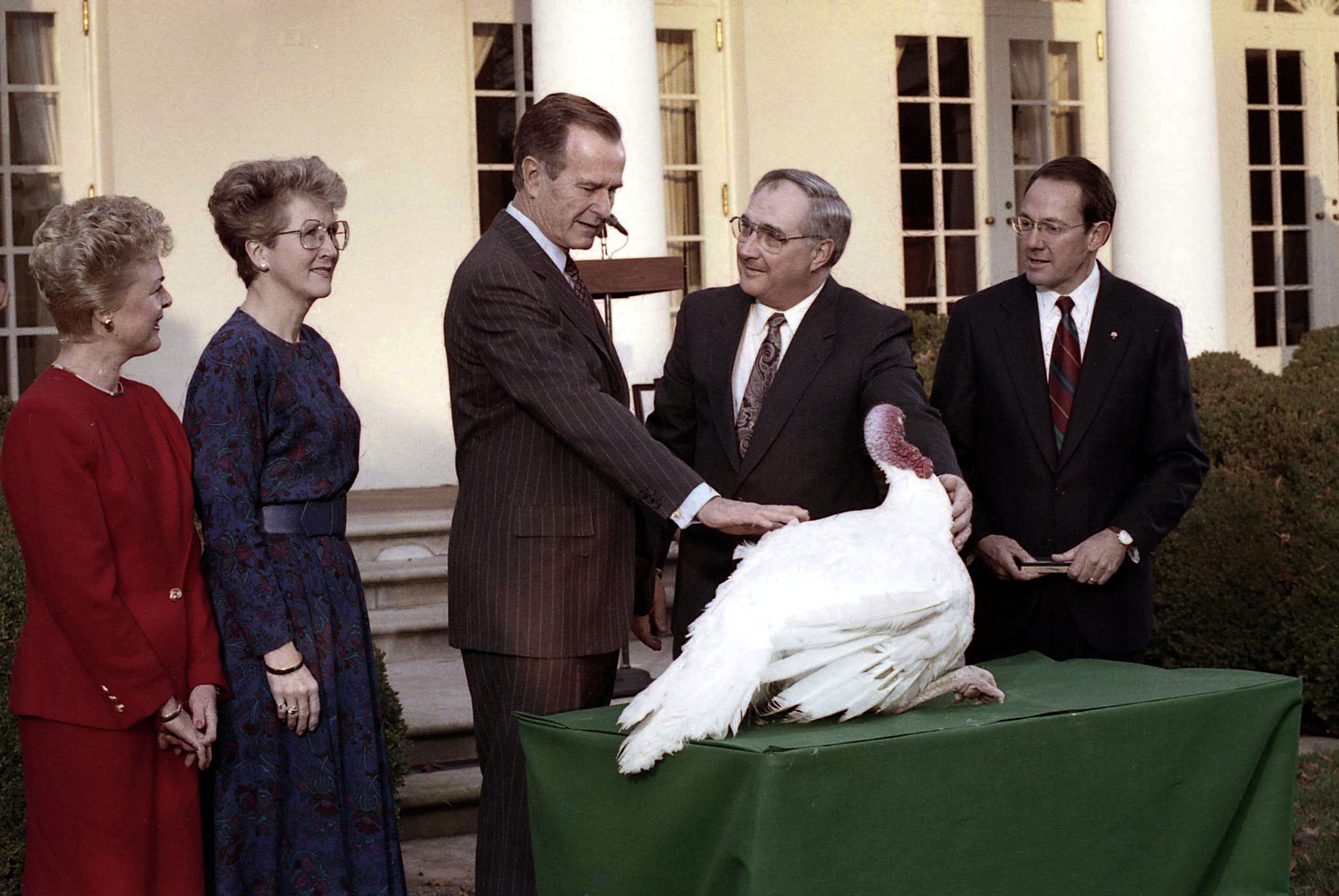
President George H. W. Bush at the 3rd annual pardoning of the Thanksgiving turkey, 1991

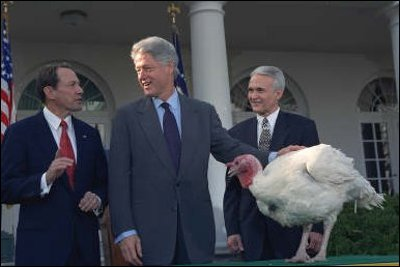
President Bill Clinton at the 11th annual pardoning of the Thanksgiving turkey, 1999

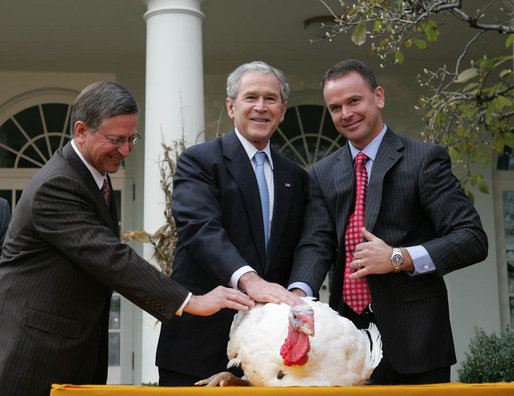
President George W. Bush at the 20th annual pardoning of the Thanksgiving turkey, 2008

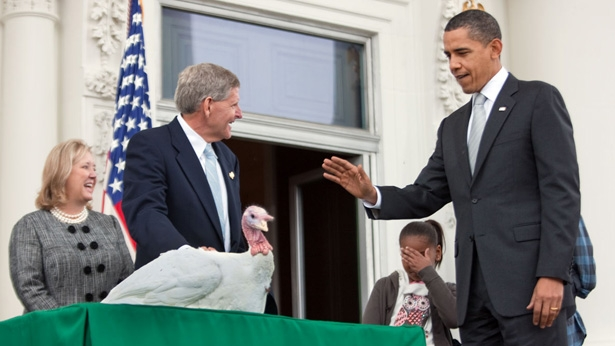
President Barack Obama pardoning a turkey called "Courage" on November 25, 2009

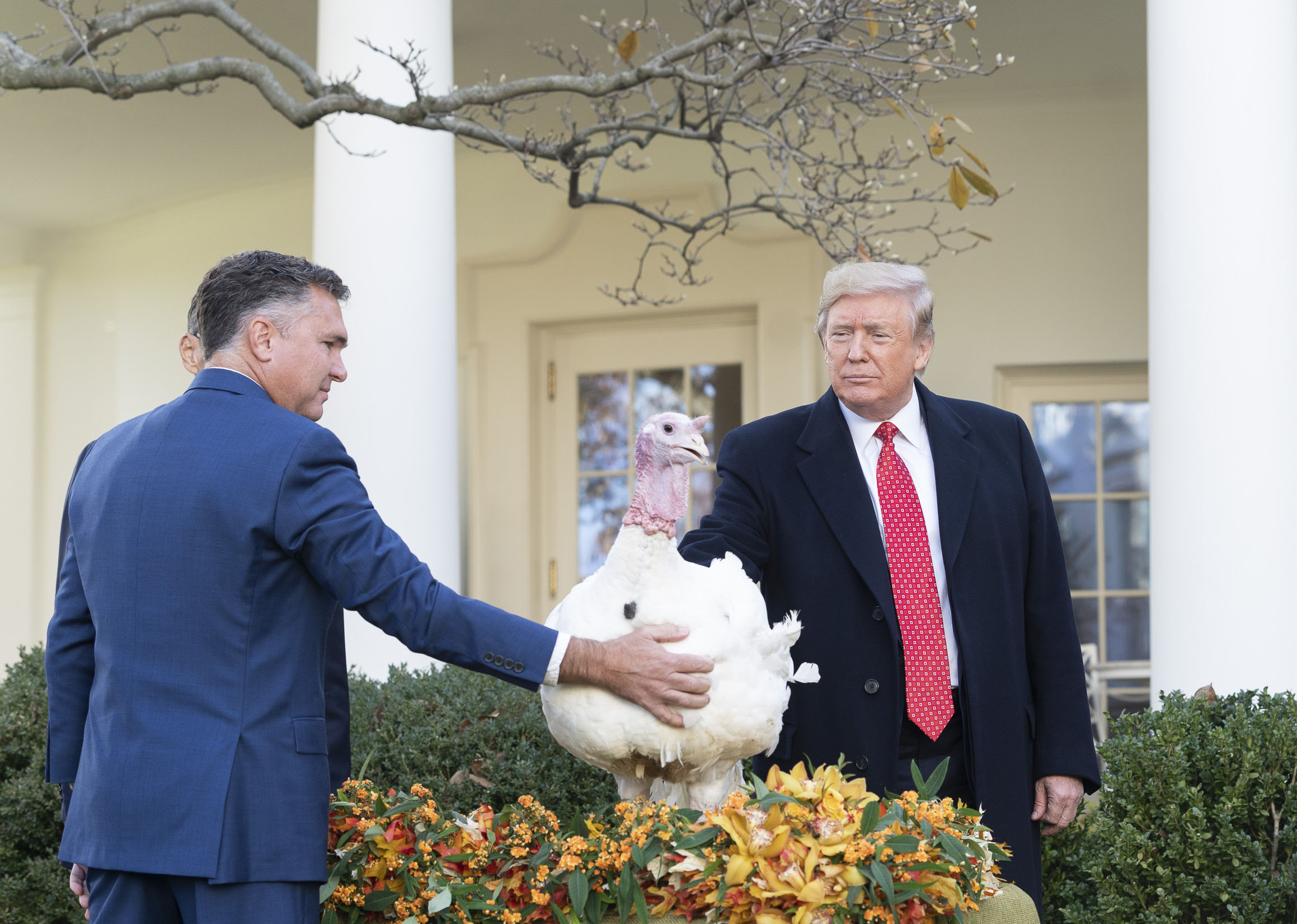
President Donald Trump pardoning a turkey called "Butter" on November 26, 2019

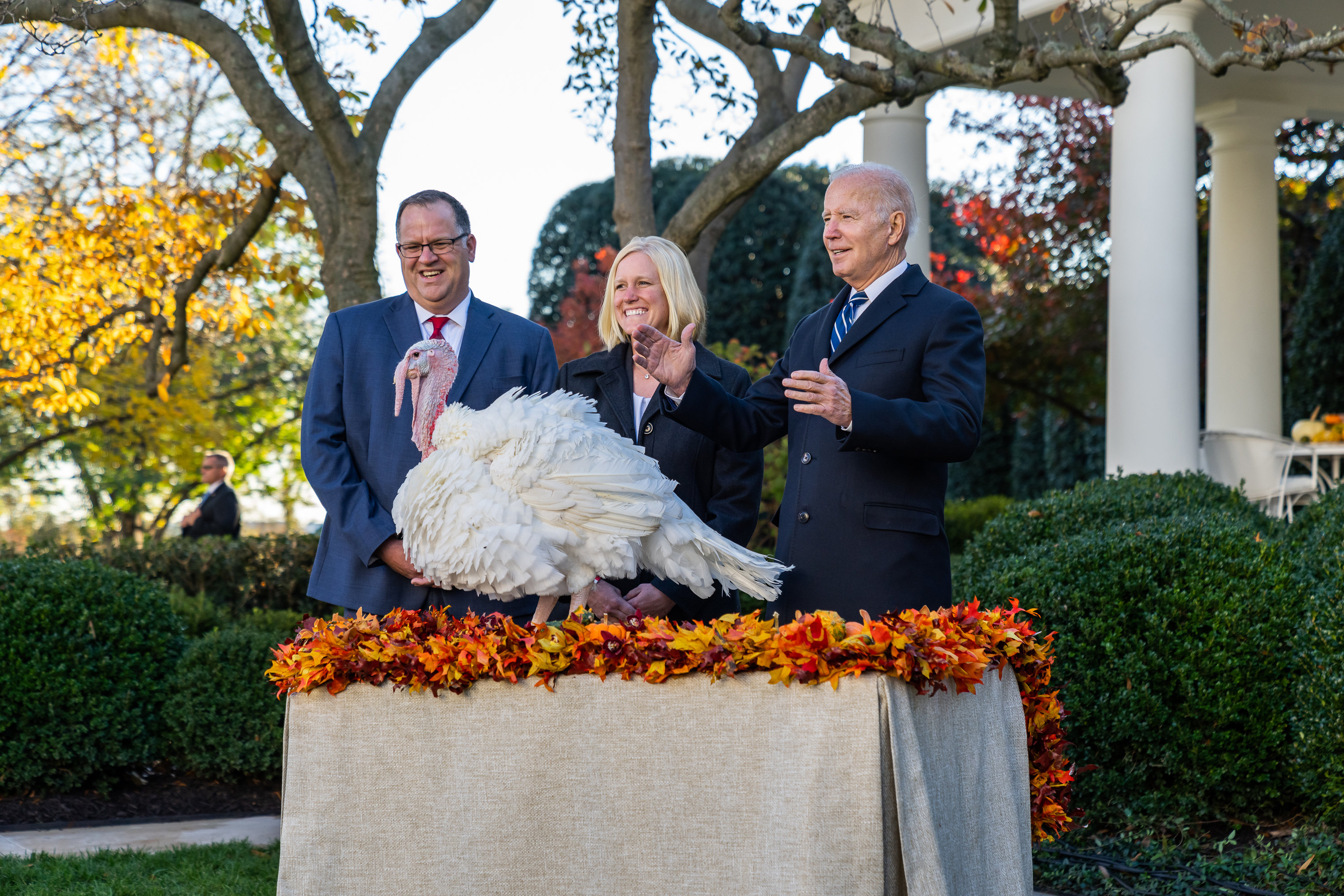
President Joe Biden pardoning a turkey called "Peanut Butter" on November 19, 2021

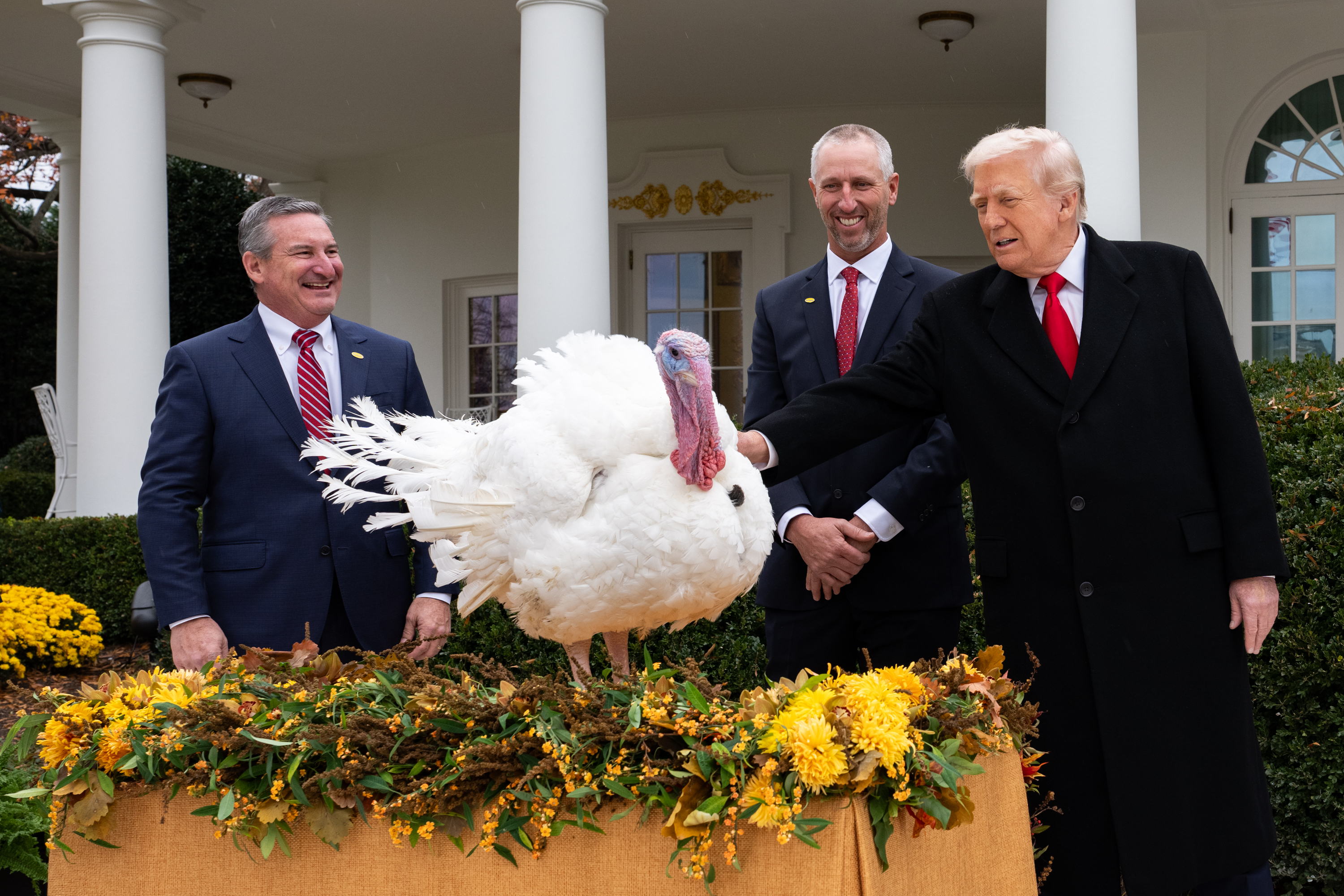
President Donald Trump pardoning a turkey called "Gobble" on November 25, 2025
