= List of turkey breeds =

Turkey breeds are reported to the DAD-IS breed database of the Food and Agriculture Organization of the United Nations by more than sixty countries. The breeds reported include commercial/industrial strains, local types and recognised breeds in many countries.

== United States ==
Twenty breeds are reported to DAD-IS by the United States. Eight of them are recognised by the American Poultry Association in its breed standard, the American Standard of Perfection, where however they are classified as "varieties" rather than as breeds. This may be because the original genotype for domestic turkeys was for Bronze, and all other color varieties are due to mutations from it.

=== APA varieties ===
Variety	Year admitted by APA	Type	Comments	images
Beltsville Small White	1951	heritage turkey	Created by the USDA at Beltsville Agricultural Research Center in Beltsville, Maryland. Once very popular, it is now rare.	
Black turkey	1874	heritage turkey	Alternatively called Spanish Black or Norfolk Black or American Black.	
Bourbon Red	1909	heritage turkey		
Bronze	1874	heritage turkey	The Broad Breasted Bronze, like the Broad Breasted White, are nonstandardized commercial strains that do not qualify as a variety.	
Narragansett	1874	heritage turkey		
Royal Palm	1977	heritage turkey	Largely ornamental, mostly white with distinctive black banding.	
Slate	1874	heritage turkey	Alternatively known as Blue Slate or Lavender.	
White Holland	1874			

== Europe ==
Twelve breeds are recognized by the Entente Européenne d'Aviculture et de Cuniculture. Others with breed standards of European national associations are accepted.

=== EE breeds ===
Variety (by National Standards)	Variety (colour)	country of origin	Comments
American Blue (Slate Turkey)	gray/blue	US	
American Bronze	Brown/Black base color with white near some of the turkey's feather tips.	US	
American Black		US	Pink legs and horn-colored beak. Spanish Black and Norfolk Black have black pigmented legs and beak.
Beltsville Small White	white	US	
Dindon du Bourbonnais	black	F	
Cambridge Bronze		GB	
Deutsche Pute		D	with EE-Standard of Perfection
Deutsche Pute	blue	D	
Deutsche Pute	Bourbon Red	D	
Deutsche Pute	Bronze	D	
Deutsche Pute	Cröllwitzer	D	≈Royal Palm (US)
Deutsche Pute	Buff	D	
Deutsche Pute	Bronce	D	
Deutsche Pute	narragansett coloured	D	
Deutsche Pute	Red	D	
Deutsche Pute	Red Winged	D	
Deutsche Pute	Black	D	
Deutsche Pute	Black Winged Bronze	D	
Deutsche Pute	British white	D	
French turkey (Dindon)	porcelan coloured	F	
Dindon du Gers	schwarz	F	
Tacchino castano d'Italia		I	
Tacchino nero d'Italia	black	I	
Pavo oscense	black	SP	
Narragansett		US	
Norfolk Black Turkey		GB	
Dindon de Ronquières	fauve	B	
Dindon de Ronquières	à épaulettes jaunes	B	≈Tricoloré du Colorado (F), ≈Sweetgrass (US)
Dindon de Ronquières	jaspé	B	≈Royal Palm (US), ≈Cröllwitzer (EE)
Dindon de Ronquières	perdrix	B	≈Krefelder Pute (D)
Dindon de Ronquières	White (blanc)	B	
Royal Palm	black and white	GB	
Dindon rouge des Ardennes		B/F	a French breed, supposedly brought to Flanders in the 16th century from Mexico by the Spanish.
Dindon de Sologne	black	F	
Czech turkey (Česká krůta)	Czech Wild White-braided Turkey (Divocezbarvené bíle lemované)	CZ	
Czech turkey (Česká krůta)	šedědivocezbarvene bíle lemované	CZ	
White Holland		US	
English Turkey	buff	E	

Other varieties not recognized by the APA or EE include the following:

- Auburn or Light Brown is an extremely rare as its numbers are not considered high enough for inclusion in the Standard. An extremely rare variant of the Auburn is called the Silver Auburn.
- Buff (or Jersey Buff) is a very rare heritage breed.
- Chocolate breed is chocolate brown in color. Day-old poults are white-faced with chocolate bodies.
- Midget White is a rare heritage breed sometimes confused with the Beltsville Small White.
- Zagorje (Zagorski puran) is a Croatian variant of turkey.

== See also ==
- Turkey genus
- Wild turkey of North America
- Domestic turkey
- Ocellated turkey, a species of turkey residing primarily in the Yucatán Peninsula in Mexico.
