= Auburn turkey =

Breed of turkey

The Auburn, also known as the Light Brown, is a breed of domestic turkey. A heritage turkey, the Auburn is one of the rarest varieties currently in existence. It has been referenced by name in written records since the 18th century and is named after the light reddish-brown color of its plumage. There is also an extremely rare variant of the Auburn, called the Silver Auburn.

== History ==
This is an old variety that was listed in receipts when transporting turkeys to markets in "turkey trots" during the late 18th and early 19th centuries in Philadelphia. They are sex-linked and thus were important at the beginning of this century for producing poults that could be sexed at hatching. Cross-breedings of Auburn toms and Bronze hens were done to produce Bronze toms and Auburn hens thus making it quite easy to sex poults by color at hatch. However, this did not become a serious market requirement and they never became very popular. However, when breeding Auburn turkeys together, auburn-colored poults will be produced in both sexes.

== Types ==
Auburn describes a variation in the typical bronze plumage color in which bronze is replaced with a red-brown pigmentation. At day of age, the Auburn poult resembles the Bronze but with black stripes replaced with a red-brown coloration. In the adult bird, the bronze pigmentation is also replaced by a red-brown color. The barring present in the primary and secondary flight feathers is red-brown and white in contrast to the black and white typical in the bronze bird.

== See also ==
- List of turkey breeds
- Heritage turkey
