= Jersey Buff =

Breed of turkey

The Buff or Jersey Buff is a breed of domestic turkey named for its buff-colored plumage.

== History ==
Accepted into the Standard of Perfection by the American Poultry Association in 1874, the original strain of Buff turkey was used in the development of the Bourbon Red breed, but had died out entirely by the early 20th century. This was partly due to the difficulty in selectively breeding the proper color pattern, and also to the rise of new commercial breeds on the market.

In the 1940s, interest in a buff turkey was revived, and a new strain of the breed — called the New Jersey Buff after where it was developed — was created. Still, the Broad Breasted White continued to edge out all other heritage turkey breeds and today the Buff is critically endangered, according to the American Livestock Breeds Conservancy. It has also been included in Slow Food USA's Ark of Taste. The breed is most popular in the U.S., but is also found in the U.K. and Australia.

== Characteristics ==
The Buff has a very light or reddish brown plumage, which is its defining characteristic. A trait that drew interest from breeders is the fact that the lighter feathers of the breed present an easier, cleaner carcass. However, it has not been aggressively selected for production characteristics, and is thus significantly smaller than many modern breeds. Young toms weigh around 21 pounds and mature hens weigh roughly 12 pounds.

== See also ==
- List of turkey breeds
- Heritage turkey
