= National Turkey Federation =

Nonprofit

- Abbreviation: NTF
- Formation: Tax-exempt since September 1944; 81 years ago
- Type: 501(c)(6)
- Headquarters: Washington, D.C.
- Revenue: 3,656,507 USD (2023)
- Expenses: 3,657,060 USD (2023)
- Website: eatturkey.org

The National Turkey Federation (NTF) is the non-profit national trade association based in Washington, D.C., United States, representing the turkey industry and its allies and affiliates. NTF advocates for all segments of the turkey industry, providing services and conducting activities which increase demand for its members' products. The NTF represents its members before the U.S. Congress and the various regulatory agencies, such as the U.S. Department of Agriculture's Food Safety and Inspection Service.

Among members of the general public, NTF is best known for its role in the National Thanksgiving Turkey Presentation, an annual ceremony where a live domestic turkey is presented to the President of the United States just before Thanksgiving Day. NTF began presenting the National Thanksgiving Turkey during the presidency of Harry Truman. The custom of "pardoning" the turkey started with Bush I in 1989. Two birds are brought to the White House for final selection and the President invariably grants a "pardon" to both birds.

The federation's official website, EatTurkey.com, is home to thousands of turkey recipes, cooking and preparation tips, and educational information on the turkey industry.
