= Narragansett turkey =

Breed of turkey

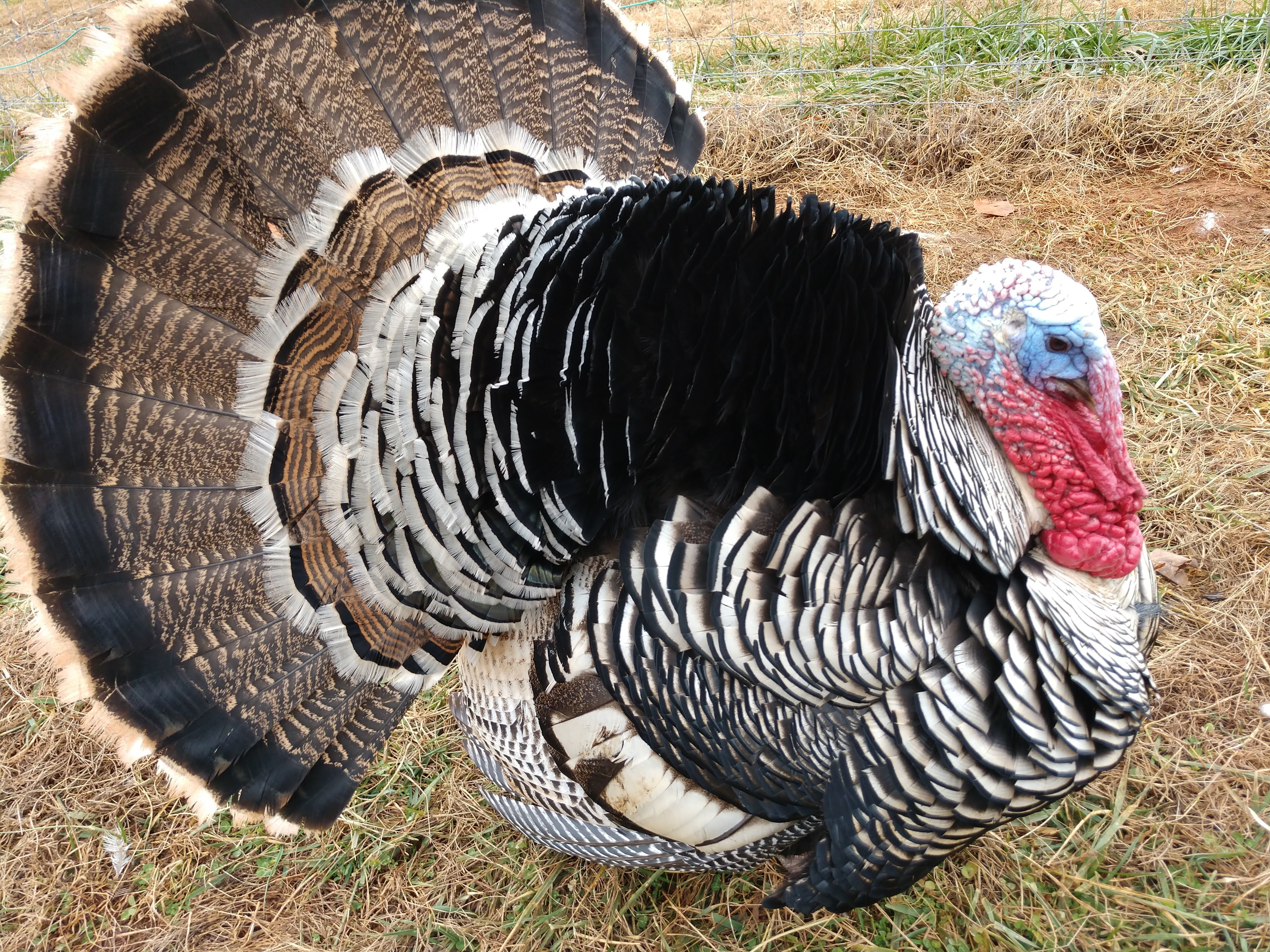
- Male Narragansett turkey, approx. 2–3 years old
- Country of origin: New England

Traits
- Skin color: black, gray, tan, and white feathers

Classification
- APA: Heritage breed

The Narragansett turkey is a breed of Meleagris gallopavo which descends from a cross between the eastern wild turkey (Meleagris gallopavo silvestris) and the domestic turkey. According to the American Livestock Breeds Conservancy, the Narragansett turkey is a "historic variety, unique to North America" and is named for Narragansett Bay and thus the Narragansett people.

== Characteristics ==
The Narragansett has plumage with black, gray, tan, and white feathers. It resembles the Bronze turkey but has feathers of gray or dull black replacing the Bronze's distinctive coppery coloring. The Narragansett sometimes has bars of white feathers on its wings due to a genetic mutation not found outside the United States. It has a black beard, a horn-colored beak, and a mostly featherless head and neck which range in color from red to blueish white.

The breed is prized for its excellent temperament combining a calm disposition with good maternal abilities. They mature early, are good egg producers, have excellent quality meat, and "when kept at liberty, [it] doesn't wander too far from home". Improved over generations through selective breeding, young Narragansett turkey toms weigh 22–28 pounds and hens weigh 12–16 pounds. They can run quickly, fly well, and prefer to spend their nights roosting in trees.

== History ==
While never as popular as the Bronze turkey, this breed was still valued for commercial agriculture across the United States. According to an account from the early 1870s, flocks of up to two hundred birds were common. Narragansett turkeys were successful at foraging for crickets, grasshoppers and other insects, and could be maintained with little supplemental feed.

Narragansett turkey became the foundation of the turkey industry in New England and was especially important in Rhode Island and Connecticut. It was also popular in the Mid-Atlantic States and the Midwest. This breed was recognized by the American Poultry Association in 1874.

In the early 20th century, the popularity of the Bronze turkey grew even more and the Narragansett turkey soon became a rarity. It was not commercially cultivated for many decades until the early 21st century when a growing niche market was established for consumers with a "renewed interest in the biological fitness, survivability, and superior flavor" of the Narragansett.

== Varieties ==
A fancy variety known as the Silver Narragansett was developed with white plumage replacing the tan and gray. Never accepted by the American Poultry Association and very rare, Silver Narragansett mutations still occasionally appear in flocks of more typically colored birds.

== See also ==
- List of turkey breeds
- Heritage turkey
