= Heritage turkey =

Strain of domestic turkey

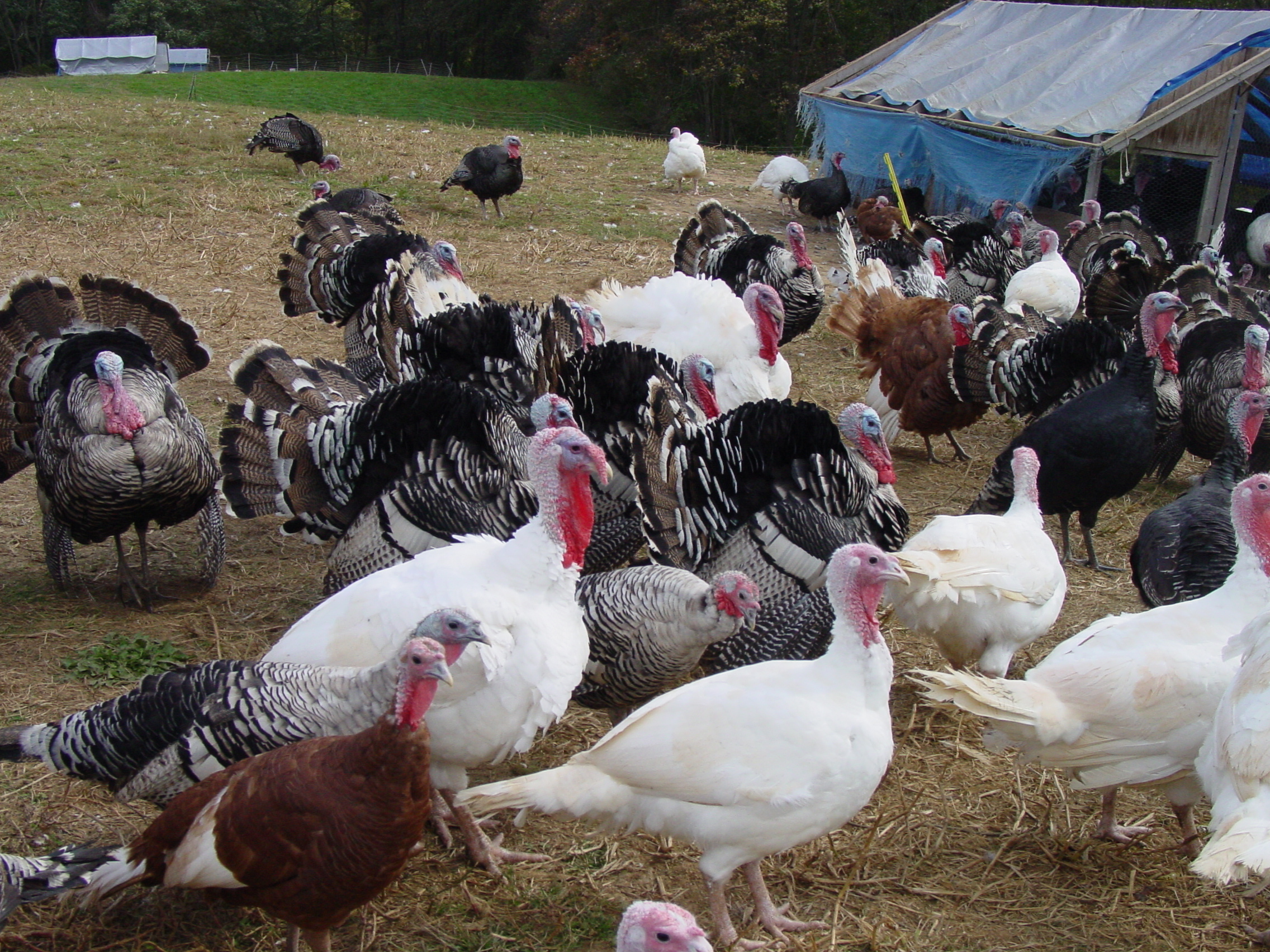
Heritage turkeys of various breeds on a farm in Maryland

A heritage turkey is one of a variety of strains of domestic turkey which retains historic characteristics that are no longer present in the majority of turkeys raised for consumption since the mid-20th century. Heritage turkeys can be differentiated from other domestic turkeys in that they are biologically capable of being raised in a manner that more closely matches the natural behavior and life cycle of wild turkeys. Heritage turkeys have a relatively long lifespan and a much slower growth rate than turkeys bred for industrial agriculture, and unlike industrially bred turkeys, can reproduce without artificial insemination.

More than ten different turkey breeds are classified as heritage turkeys, including the Auburn, Buff, Black, Bourbon Red, Narragansett, Royal Palm, Slate, Standard Bronze, Pied, Harvey Speckled and Midget White. Some prominent chefs, farmers, and food critics have also contended that heritage turkey meat tastes better and is more healthful.

Despite increasing interest in heritage turkeys, they are still a tiny minority, perhaps 25,000 raised annually compared to more than 200,000,000 industrial turkeys and 7,000,000 turkeys in the wild, and most heritage breeds are endangered in some respect.

== History ==
For most of history, turkeys were primarily raised on small family farms for meat and as a form of pest control (turkeys are prodigious eaters of insects). But with the advent of factory farming of poultry, turkeys began to be selectively bred for increasingly larger size, focusing especially on the production of breast meat. Beginning in the 1920s and continuing into the 1950s, broad-breasted fowl began to replace all other types of turkey in commercial production. The favorite breed at the time was the Broad Breasted Bronze, which was developed from the Standard Bronze. In the 1960s producers began to heavily favor turkeys that did not show the dark pin feathers in their carcass, and thus the Broad Breasted White grew to dominate the industry, a trend which continues to this day.

To meet perceived consumer demand and increase producers' profit margins, the goal in turkey farming became the production of the maximum amount of breast meat at the lowest possible cost. As a result of selection for this single trait, 70% of the weight of mass market turkeys is in their breast. Consequently, the birds are so heavy that they are completely incapable of reproducing without artificial insemination, and they reach such extreme weights so quickly their overall development fails to keep pace with their rapidly accruing muscle mass, resulting in severe immune system, cardiac, respiratory and leg problems.

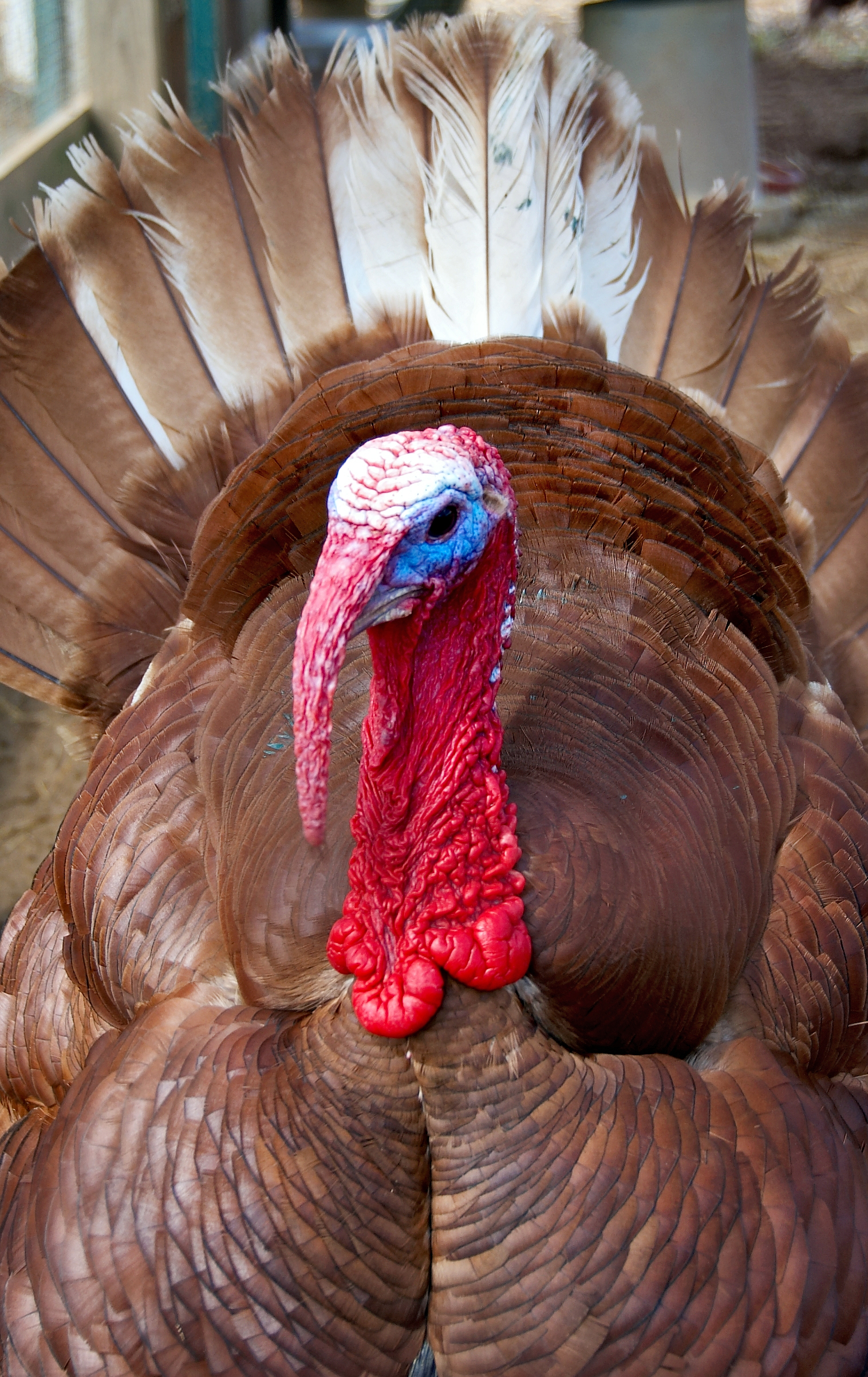
Heritage turkeys, like this Bourbon Red tom, can have a much more striking appearance than the Broad Breasted White.

For over 35 years, the overwhelming majority of the 280 million turkeys produced in North America each year have been the product of a few genetic strains of Broad Breasted White. The breeding stock for these birds are owned largely by three multinational corporations: Hybrid Turkeys of Ontario, Canada, British United Turkeys of America in Lewisburg, West Virginia, and Nicholas Turkey Breeding Farms in Sonoma, California.

Along with the adoption of the Broad Breasted White by industrial producers, other turkey varieties faded in numbers. Other than exhibition birds and those on a scant few small farms, other turkeys virtually disappeared. By the end of the 20th century, all but the Broad Breasted White were in danger of extinction. Around this time, conservation organizations began to recognize the plight of heritage turkeys; The Livestock Conservancy considered heritage turkeys to be the most critically endangered of all domestic animals circa 1997. A census conducted by the Conservancy found less than 1,500 total breeding birds (out of all heritage varieties) were left in the country. Some breeds, such as the Narragansett, had less than a dozen individuals left, and many considered most heritage turkeys to be beyond hope.

The Livestock Conservancy, Slow Food USA, the Society for the Preservation of Poultry Antiquities (SPAA), the Heritage Turkey Foundation, and a few hundred key poultry enthusiasts launched a major effort to restore breeding populations of heritage turkeys in the late 20th century. One man in particular, Frank Reese Jr., has been credited by sources such as ABC News and The New York Times as being instrumental in preserving heritage breeds, but small farmers all across the country were also important; strains of heritage turkey kept in genetic isolation for years by family farms preserved heritage breeds for the future. Primary motivations for the endeavor included a passion for historic breeds and maintaining genetic diversity among domestic animals which humans depend upon. Consumer and restaurant interest was also motivated by a support of local and sustainable foods.

In a 2003 census by the Livestock Conservancy, heritage turkey populations had increased by more than 200 percent. By 2006, the count of heritage turkeys in the U.S. was up to 8,800 breeding birds. Though all but the Bourbon Red and Royal Palm are still considered critically endangered, the birds have rebounded significantly.

== Definition ==
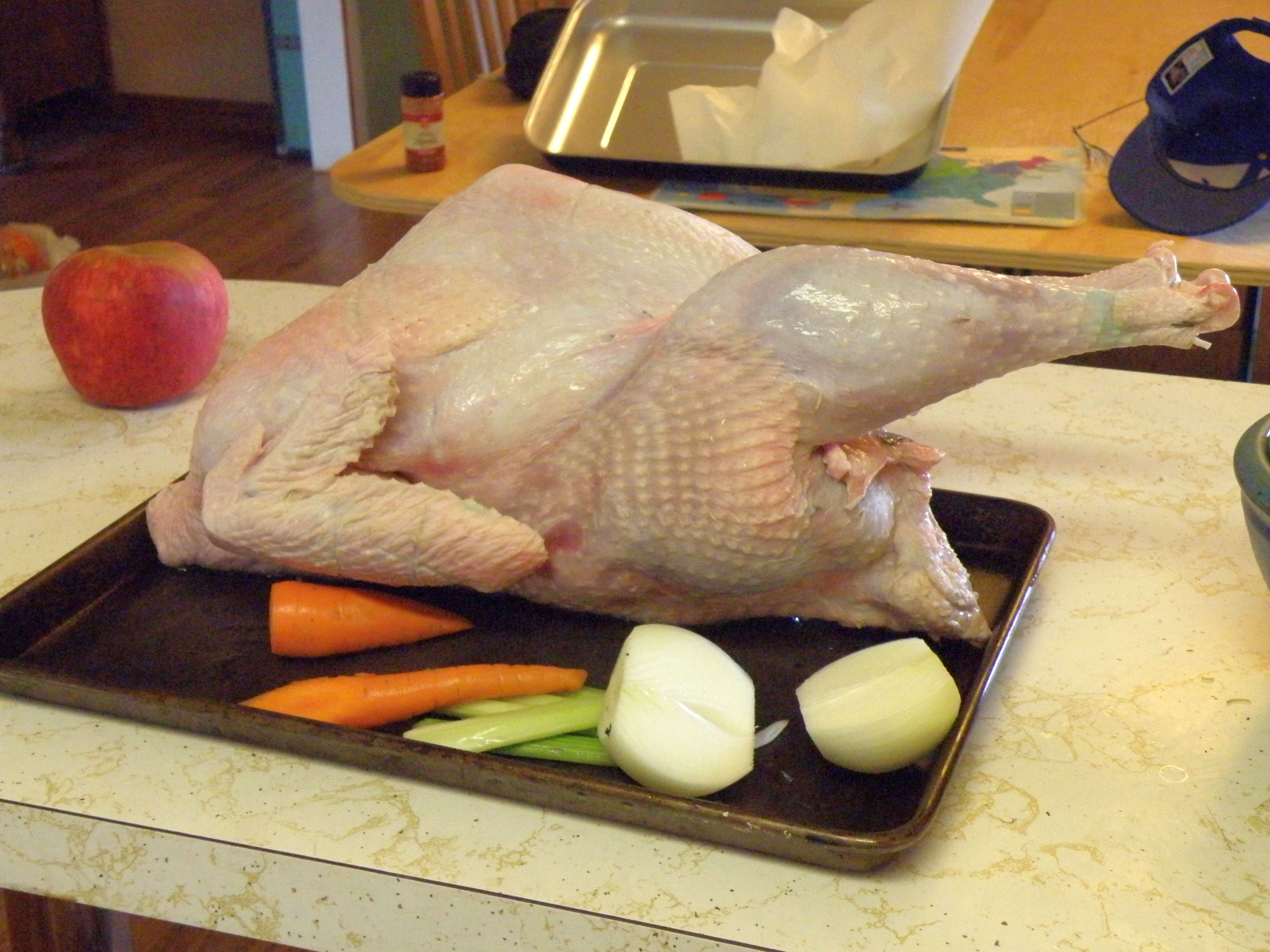
A heritage turkey prepared for roasting. Note the ratio of breast meat to dark meat is closer to 50/50.

While the moniker of heritage turkey is not a government-regulated label like organic foods, it does have a precise definition. The most notable heritage turkeys today come from specific breeds, such as the Bourbon Red, but any fowl regardless of breed can be defined as a heritage turkey if it meets the criteria mentioned below. Only a few of these are recognized by the American Poultry Association through inclusion in the Standard of Perfection.

Along with the surge in popularity of heritage turkeys, some farmers have (perhaps unknowingly) passed off birds which do not meet the basic definition of true heritage birds in an effort to cash in on the phenomenon. To be a true heritage turkey, birds must meet three specific criteria.

=== Naturally mating ===
The first criterion is that heritage turkeys are able to mate naturally with no intervention from humans, and with expected fertility rates of 70-80%. Hens can lay fertile eggs, and brood their clutches to hatching. According to The Livestock Conservancy, birds must be the result of natural reproduction in order to truly be called heritage turkeys.

=== Long productive lifespan ===
Except for a few flocks of toms kept for semen production, commercial turkeys generally never live past the point at which they reach market weight. Heritage turkeys are capable of the full normal lifespan of wild turkeys. Breeding hens are commonly productive for 5–7 years and breeding toms for 3–5 years. They are also more well-suited for outdoor and/or free range conditions in pastured poultry operations.

=== Slow growth rate ===
All heritage turkeys have a relatively slow to moderate rate of growth. Turkeys raised in industrial agriculture are slaughtered at 14 to 18 weeks of age, while heritage turkeys reach a marketable weight in about 28 weeks, giving the birds time to develop a strong skeletal structure and healthy organs prior to building muscle mass. This growth rate is identical to that of the commercial varieties of the first half of the 20th century.

== As food ==
...this represented a completely different order of turkey. Now I understood what turkey was like before the triumph of the Broad Breasted White, and why eating turkey had once been considered a great treat...

— Michael Pollan

Heritage means a bird is more than a descendant of earlier breeds with names like Red Bourbon, Narragansett, and Standard Bronze: The Livestock Conservancy outlines that heritage turkeys must mate naturally, have a slow growth rate that results from a longer lifespan and spend their life outdoors. Heritage turkeys are smaller than their commercially bred counterparts (which are all Broad Breasted Whites) and have a stronger—some say gamy—flavor. Less breast meat and more highly exercised thighs and wings mean heritage turkeys benefit from longer, slower cooking times.

Heritage turkeys have been praised by chefs and food critics alike as being richer in flavor than industrial birds, though the lack of a large amount of breast meat means cooking times and methods may differ substantially from non-heritage birds. Heritage turkeys are closer in taste to wild turkeys, but are several pounds larger. Part of this stated increase in flavor is due to a difference in the maturity between industrial turkeys and heritage ones - if birds are slaughtered at less than four months old, they fail to ever accrue fat layers.

Due to their rarity and the length of time involved in their growth, heritage turkeys are also far more expensive than their more common brethren. While turkeys from factory farms may be given away along with other purchases, heritage turkeys can cost upwards of $200 (USD), though prices have fallen in some areas as they become more common.

In addition to a difference in culinary characteristics, heritage turkeys are often considered to be a more healthful food; as a result of the diet of pasture-raised turkeys, heritage meat contains far higher levels of omega-3 fatty acids, which help prevent heart disease.

== See also ==
- Heirloom plant
- Rare breed (agriculture)
