= Slate turkey =

Breed of turkey

The Slate, or Blue Slate, is a breed of domestic turkey known for the slate gray color of its plumage. Lighter birds are sometimes called Lavender turkeys. Turkeys of the Slate breed may actually be any number of shades between pure black and white, but only ash-gray birds are eligible for showing under the directive of the American Poultry Association’s ‘’Standard of Perfection’’, into which they admitted as a variety in 1874. Slate turkeys are listed as critically endangered by the American Livestock Breeds Conservancy, and meet the definition of a heritage turkey breed.

== See also ==
- List of turkey breeds
- Heritage turkey
