= Henry A. Wallace Beltsville Agricultural Research Center =

Agricultural research complex in Beltsville, Maryland, United States

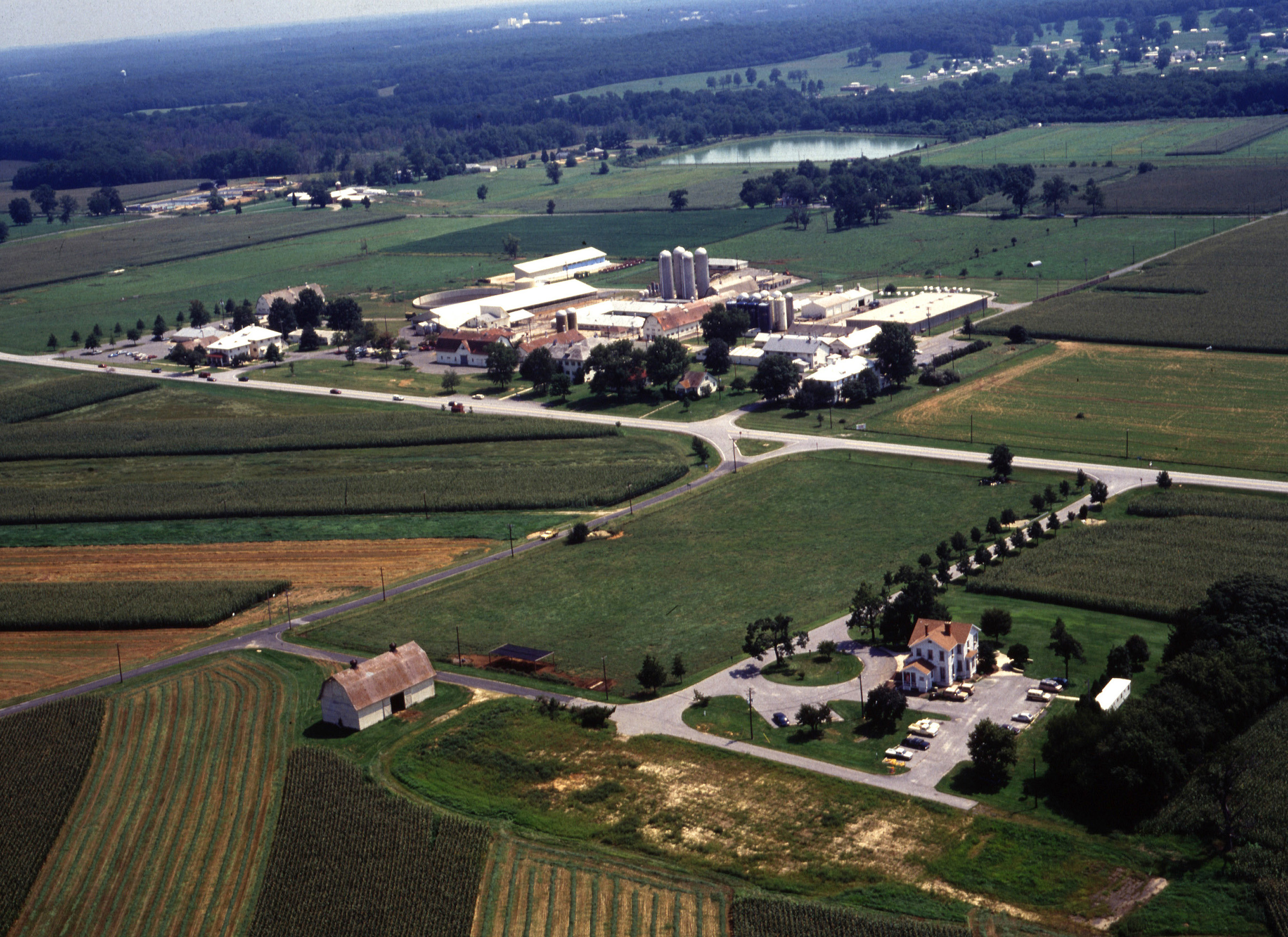

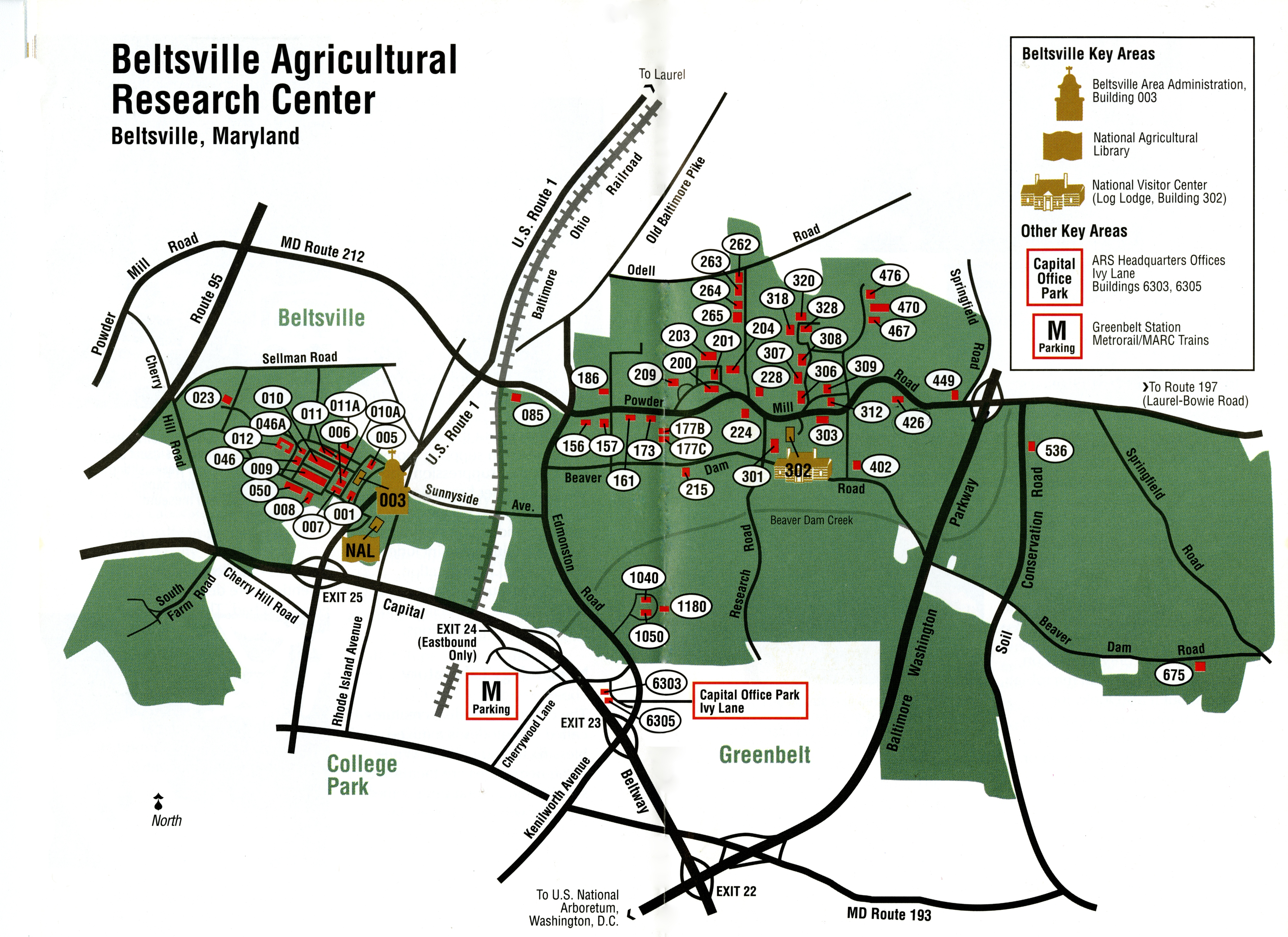
- Named after: Henry A. Wallace
- Established: 1910 (116 years ago)
- Types: research institute
- Location: Beltsville
- Country: United States
- Coordinates: 39°01′55″N 76°53′04″W
- Parent organisations: Agricultural Research Service

The Henry A. Wallace Beltsville Agricultural Research Center (BARC), also known as the National Agricultural Research Center, is a unit of the United States Department of Agriculture's Agricultural Research Service. It is located in unincorporated Prince George's County, Maryland, with sections within the Beltsville census-designated place. The BARC is named for Henry A. Wallace, former United States vice president and secretary of agriculture. BARC houses the Abraham Lincoln Building of the National Agricultural Library.

Among its research programs are Air Quality; Animal Health; Crop Production; Crop Protection and Quarantine; Crop Modeling; Food Animal Production; Food Safety; Climate Change; Human Nutrition; Integrated Farming Systems; Manure and Byproduct Utilization; Methyl Bromide Alternatives; Plant Biological and Molecular Processes; Plant Diseases; Plant Genetic Resources, Genomics, and Genetic Improvement; Quality and Utilization of Agricultural Products; Rangeland, Pasture, and Forages; Soil Resource Management; Veterinary, Medical, and Urban Entomology; and Water Quality and Management.

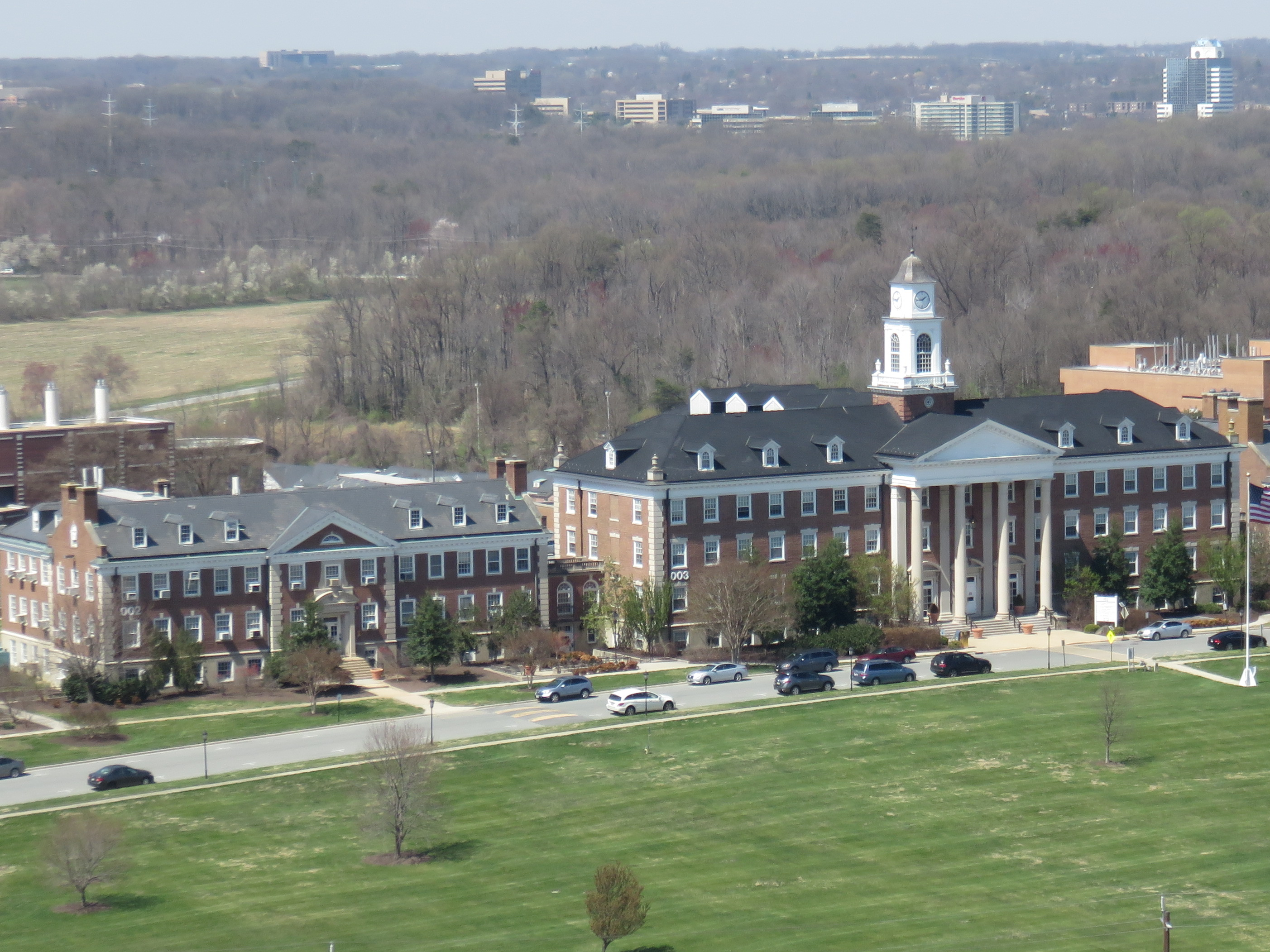
Administration Building

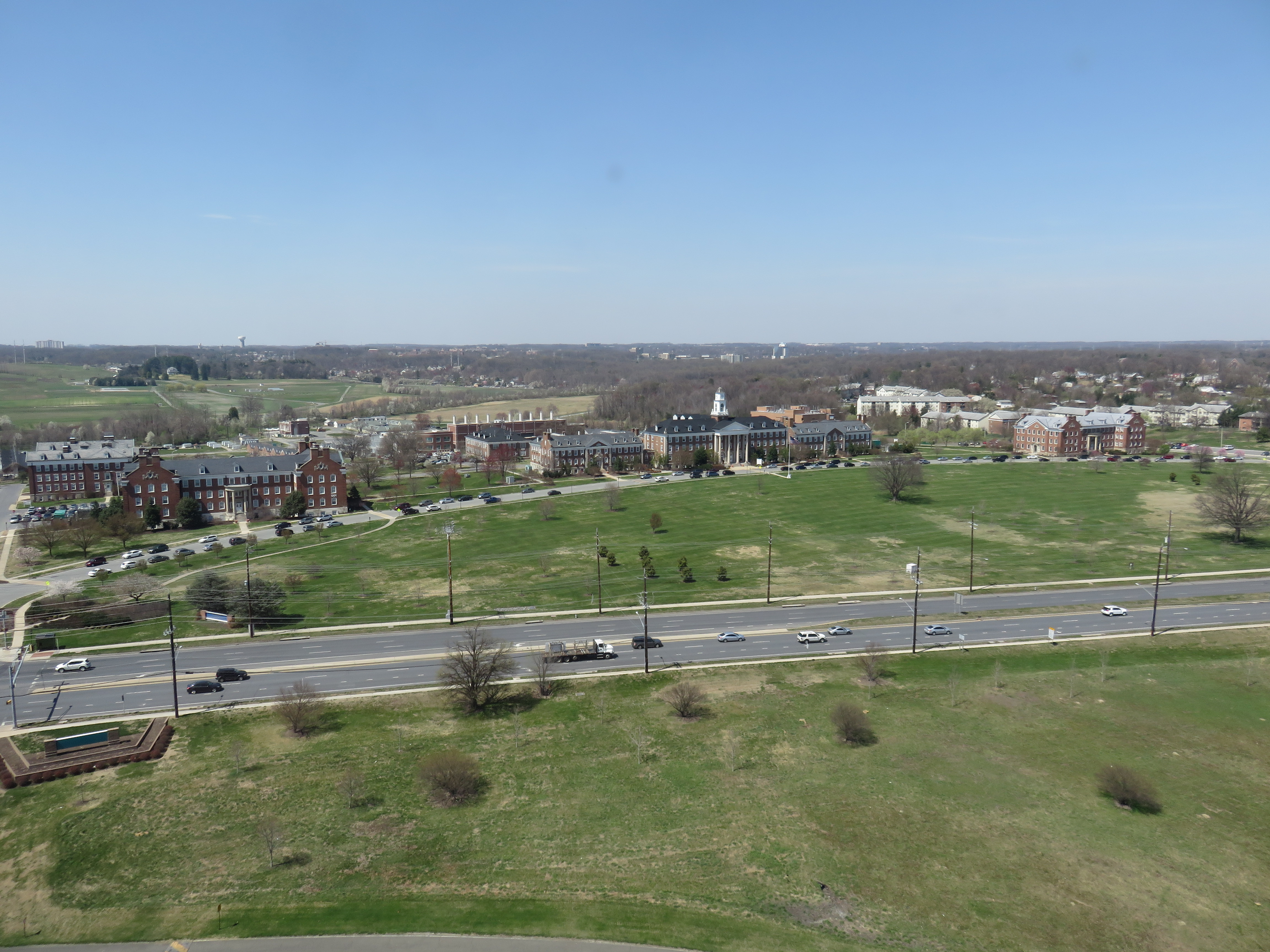
View of the campus from the National Agricultural Library

The center's Harvest for the Hungry program donates about 75,000 pounds (34 metric tons) of fruits and vegetables each year for distribution to local charities, in conjunction with volunteers from the community who do much of the labor of harvesting.

Each February, BARC hosts the Washington's Birthday Marathon, the eighth oldest marathon in the United States.

During the tornado outbreak of September 24, 2001, the BARC facilities sustained extensive damage as the result of an F3 tornado.

The center is also referenced in local folklore as the creation place of the Goatman, claiming that Goatman was once a scientist who worked at the center before an experiment on goats backfired and mutated the scientist into a half man, half goat creature who aggressively attacks cars in the vicinity of Beltsville.

== See also ==
- Beltsville Small White – American breed of turkey
