= Broad Breasted White =

Breed of turkey

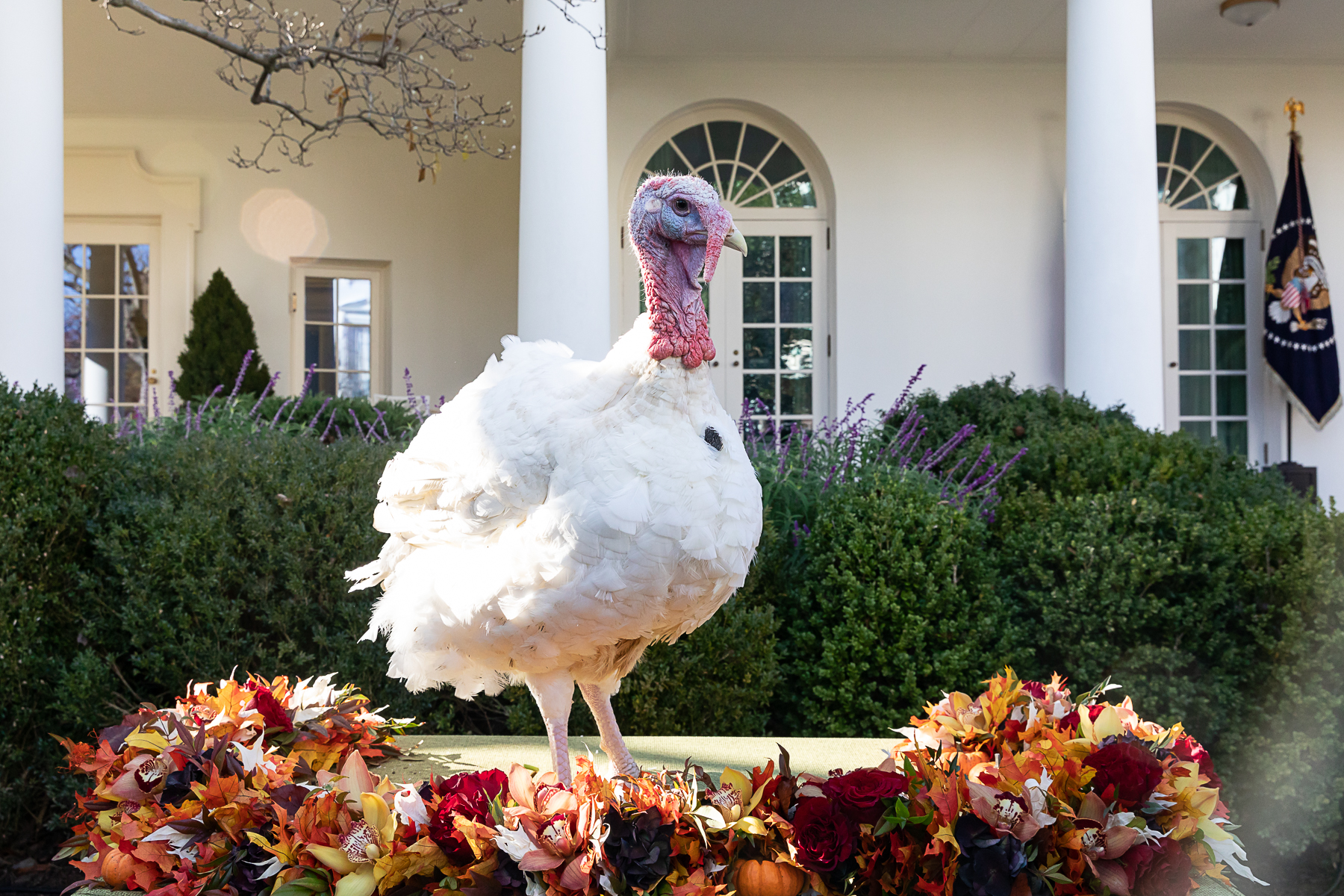
Peas, a 39-pound broad breasted white tom

The Broad Breasted White is commercially the most widely used breed of domesticated turkey. These birds have shorter breast bones and larger breasts, sometimes rendering them unable to breed without human assistance (typically via artificial insemination). They produce more breast meat and their pin feathers are less visible when the carcass is dressed due to their white color. These properties have made the breed popular in commercial turkey production but enthusiasts of slow food argue that the development of this breed and the methods in commercial turkey production have come at a cost of less flavor. The Broad Breasted White has been the dominant breed of turkey for food production since the 1960s, having superseded the Broad Breasted Bronze (from which it was bred by cross-breeding with the White Holland) in industrial settings and the Beltsville Small White for home cooking.

These birds are grown in large, fully automated grow-out barns, which may house as many as 10,000 birds. The growing process for these birds has been so well refined, the birds often grow to larger than 40 lbs. Average birds are typically 38-40 lbs. Because of their size, predilection for overeating, and sedentary personalities, they are flightless and prone to health problems associated with obesity, such as heart disease, respiratory failure and joint damage; even if such turkeys are spared from slaughter (such as those involved in the annual turkey pardons), they usually have short lives as a result. Broad Breasted Whites also have a very high percentage of their eggs hatch, which makes turkey eggs as a food item a rare delicacy.

== See also ==
- List of turkey breeds
