= Pin feather =

Developing bird feather that has bloodflow

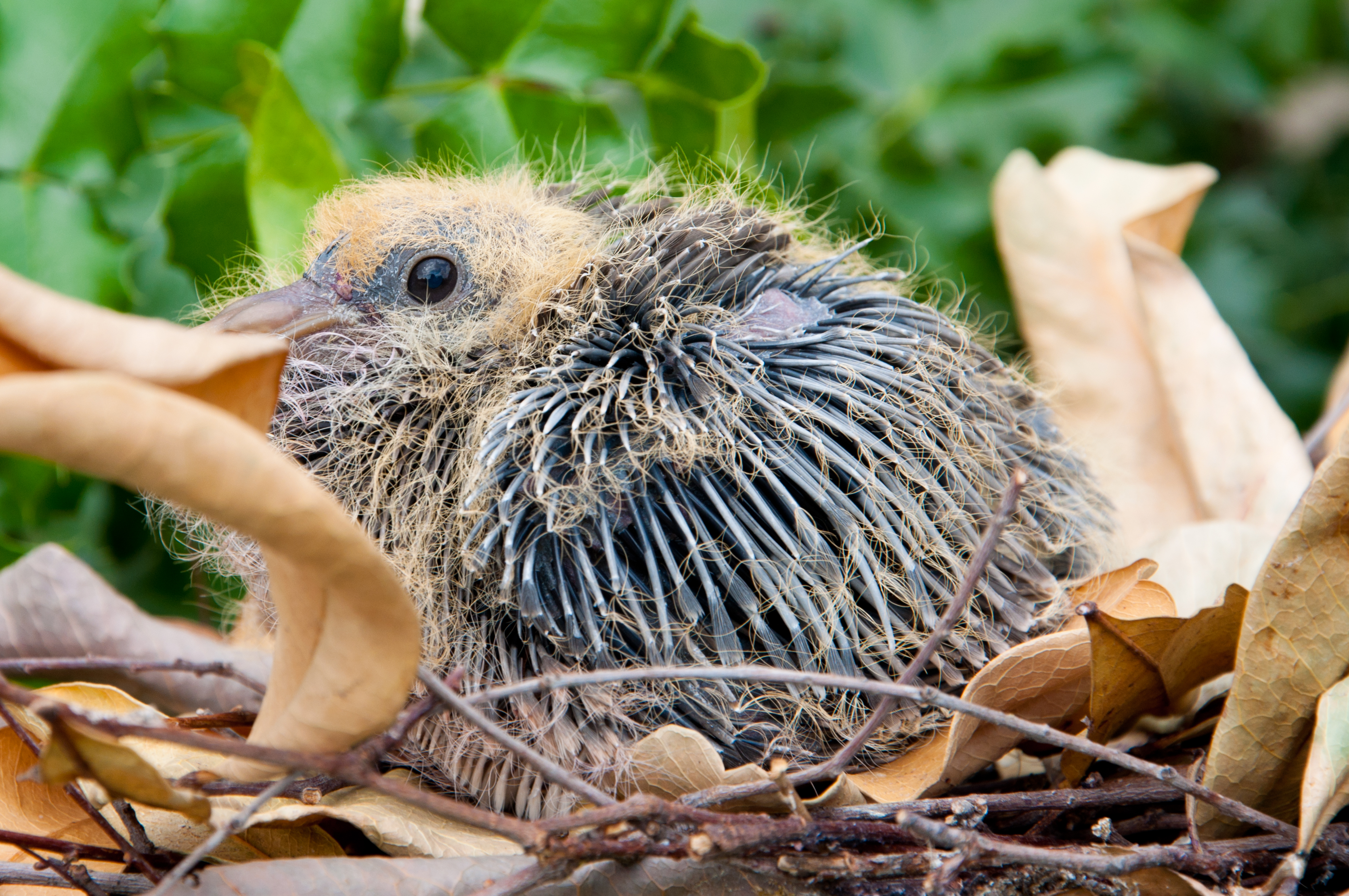
A rock dove nestling with visible pin feathers

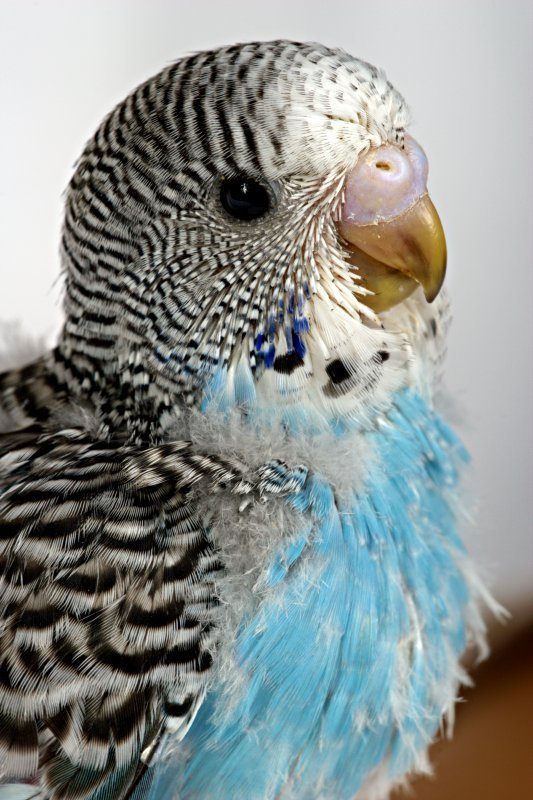
A budgie with pinfeathers from infancy

A pin feather is a developing feather on a bird. This feather can grow as a new feather during the bird's infancy, or grow to replace one from moulting.

The pin feather looks somewhat like a feather shaft. However, unlike a fully developed feather, the pin feather has a blood supply flowing through it; at this stage, it may also be called a blood feather. As such, if the pin feather is damaged, a bird can bleed heavily.

As the pin feather grows longer, the blood supply is concentrated in only the base of the shaft, and the tip of the shaft encases the feather itself in a waxy coating. As moulting birds preen, they remove the waxy coating, and the feather unfurls.

When the blood has receded, the term "blood feather" is no longer synonymous with "pin feather" – it can only be referred to as a pin feather.

== Growth ==
Pin feathers begin to develop after the feather bud invaginates a cylinder of epidermal tissue around the base of the dermal papilla, forming the feather follicle. At the base of the feather follicle, epithelial cells proliferate to grow the epidermal collar or cylinder. As the epidermal cylinder extends through dermis, it differentiates into a protective peripheral sheath, longitudinal barb ridges, and growth plates. Over time these barb ridges lengthen helically, branch to create barbs and barbules, and fuse to form the rachis or central shaft. Moreover, the barb plate further differentiate into hooklets and cilia, while the marginal and axial plate die to form the intervening space within the feather structure.

A bird with pin feathers may be said to be "in pin".

== Pet care ==
During moulting, a bird may get careless and begin to chew its feathers and might accidentally damage a blood feather. To prevent this, it is necessary that the bird is given chewing toys so that it does not chew at its own feathers. Pin feathers are sensitive, and some pet birds do not enjoy being handled while moulting for this reason.

To stop bleeding from a pin feather, it is necessary to pluck the feather from its base. Bleeding must be taken care of as soon as possible to prevent too much blood loss. However, this can be difficult for a pet bird owner to do on a larger bird, so it is recommended owners have the necessary tools on hand in a first aid kit. If assistance is needed, the bird should be taken to a veterinarian as soon as possible.

== See also ==
- filoplume (not to be confused)
