= Bronze turkey =

Breed of turkey

Bronze
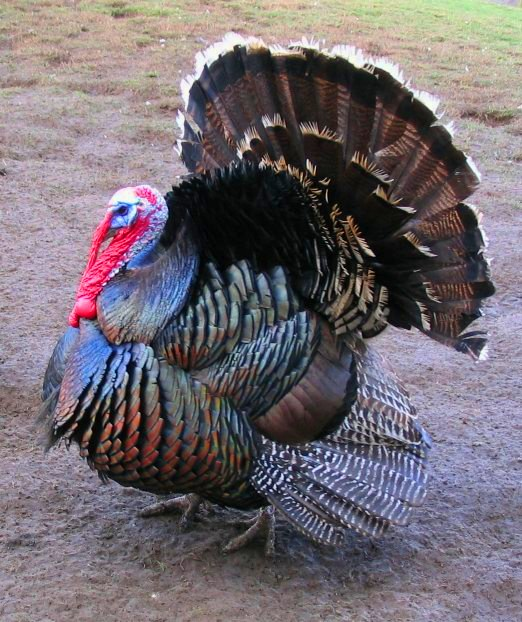
- A Bronze turkey tom
- Country of origin: England

Traits
- Skin color: Light Pink/White

Classification
- APA: Heritage breed

The Bronze is a breed of domestic turkey. The name refers to its plumage, which bears an iridescent bronze-like sheen. The Bronze had been the most popular turkey throughout most of American history, but waned in popularity beginning in the mid-20th century. Later in its history, the breed was divided into two distinct types: the Broad Breasted Bronze and the Standard Bronze. A great deal of confusion exists about the difference between Standard and Broad Breasted Bronzes, or whether there is any difference at all. Collectively, the Standard and Broad Breasted varieties are simply called the Bronze turkey.

== History ==
Bronze turkeys are the product of crossing domestic turkeys brought from England, with the wild turkey. These matings produced a bird that was larger and more robust than the European turkeys, and tamer than wild turkeys. Though the Bronze turkey type was created in the 18th century, the actual name was not used until the 1830s, when a strain developed in the U.S. state of Rhode Island was named the Point Judith Bronze. The name later spread to be used in reference to the breed as a whole, and was in the process simplified to just "Bronze". In the British Isles, the Bronze was associated with Cambridge, and was called the Cambridge Bronze, but again this name has been simplified to just "Bronze".

The Bronze was first admitted into the American Poultry Association's Standard of Perfection in 1874. Later, beginning in the late 19th and early 20th centuries, some Bronze turkeys were selected for larger size. These much bigger birds became known as the Broad Breasted Bronze, to differentiate them from the original type of bird which was bred to the breeds' Standard of Perfection, and so was called the Standard (or Unimproved) Bronze.

Apart from the difference in size, the plumage of the Standard Bronze is usually lighter and more lustrous than that of the Broad Breasted. Both have a brown color which is highlighted by shades of copper and blue-green, and the plumage overall is very similar to that of the wild turkey.

The Broad Breasted Bronze went on to dominate the commercial turkey industry for twenty years after its development, until the Broad Breasted White became the breed of choice. Due to their size, they have lost the ability to mate naturally, and Broad Breasted Bronzes in existence today are maintained entirely by artificial insemination. Having retained the ability to reproduce naturally (among other traits), the Standard Bronze is considered to be a variety of heritage turkey.

Today, both the Standard and Broad Breasted Bronze turkeys are listed on the ALBC's conservation priority list. The Standard is listed as "Critical", but the exact numbers of Broad Breasted are currently unclear. Standard Bronzes have additionally been included in Slow Food USA's Ark of Taste, a catalog of heritage foods in danger of extinction.

== See also ==
- List of turkey breeds
- Heritage turkey
