= Heritage Foods USA =

- Founded: 2001
- Founder: Patrick Martins
- Headquarters: Brooklyn, NY
- Website: http://www.heritagefoods.com

Heritage Foods USA is an American heritage meat distribution company with offices in Brooklyn, New York. It was formed in 2001 as the sales and marketing arm of Slow Food USA — a non-profit organization founded by Patrick Martins, dedicated to celebrating regional cuisines and ingredients. The Heritage Turkey Project, which helped double the population of heritage turkeys in the United States and upgraded the Bourbon Red turkey from “rare” to “watch” status on conservation lists, was Heritage Foods USA’s first project aimed at heritage breed preservation. In 2004, it became an independent company selling heritage breed meat to top tiered restaurants and consumers.

== Operations ==
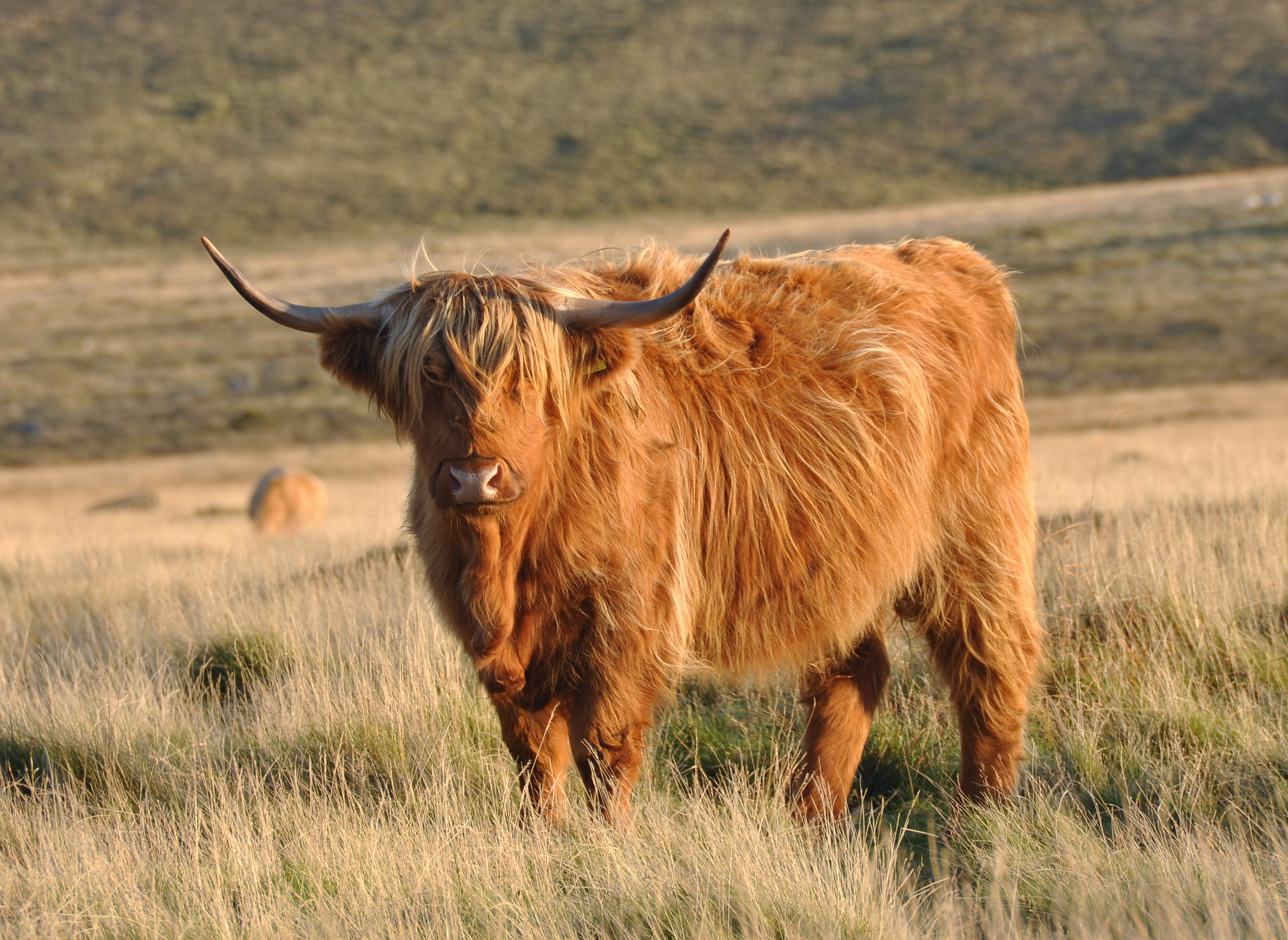
Red Highland Cattle. Heritage breed cattle.

Heritage Foods was founded in 2001 by Patrick Martins to preserve endangered species of livestock from extinction. Martins had learned about the plight of endangered foods while working for Slow Food, a non-profit organization created in Italy in 1986, in part to protest the opening of a McDonald’s on the Spanish Steps in Rome, and to bring attention to endangered regional cuisines and ingredients.

Modern factory farming focuses solely on faster-growing animals, and a bottom line that reflects little interest in biodiversity, sustainability, healthy food, or animal welfare. Ancient breeds of livestock are becoming extinct. Right now, according to the Food and Agriculture Organization of the United Nations, three-fourths of the world’s food comes from just twelve types of plants and five animals. Such a narrow spectrum is a threat to food security: the implications of such monoculture is blight, either natural or manmade.

Unlike endangered wildlife — which can be saved through foundations, preserves, and responsible zoos — the species that were once the foundation of our food supply get almost no attention, and can only be saved when popular demand increases and farmers have the incentive to raise them. In other words, the only way to save these animals is to eat them.

== Seasonal Projects ==
=== Heritage Turkey Project ===
In 2001, Heritage Foods USA partnered with Frank Reese of Good Shepherd Poultry Ranch in Lindsborg, KS, selling about 800 Heritage turkeys to Slow Food USA members around the country. Starting what would become an annual program, the Heritage Turkey Project aimed to increasing heritage turkey populations by increase market demand for the birds. Since then, Heritage Foods USA has continued their partnership with Frank Reese, the only farmer in America recognized by the USDA as a producer of authentic heritage poultry, Since the inception of the Heritage Turkey Project, many breeds have been removed from the critically endangered species list. A 2003 census by the Livestock Conservancy reported a 200 percent increase in heritage turkey populations. By 2006, the count of heritage turkeys in the U.S. was up to 8,800 breeding birds. From 2003 to 2015 the Livestock Conservancy census (first conducted in 1987) shows an increase in population of all the breeds that Frank is raising: 54% for the Black turkey; 41% for the Bourbon Red; 506% for the Narragansett; 502% for the Standard Bronze; and 1129% for the White Holland. Though all but the Bourbon Red and Royal Palm are still considered critically endangered, the birds have rebounded significantly.

Today Frank Reese is able to raises nearly 10,000 turkeys a year.

=== No Goat Left Behind ===
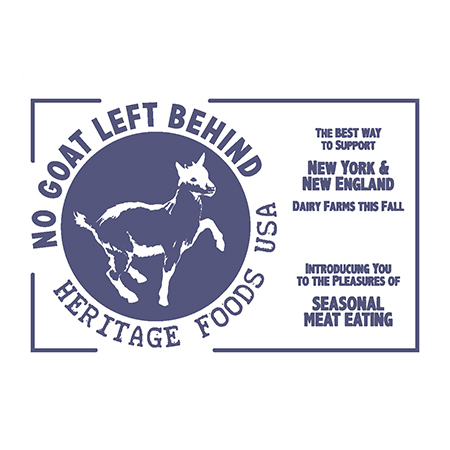
No Goat Left Behind

No Goat Left Behind is an effort launched in 2011 by Heritage Foods USA with the twin aim of introducing goat meat to American diners and developing a sustainable end market to support dairy farmers in the Northeast. To produce milk required for cheese making, female goats must have babies. This creates many unwanted males as a by-product of the dairy business. "In extreme cases the kids are killed at birth to unburden the farmer from caring for goats with little market value." Heritage Foods USA partners with New York State and Vermont family farms to sell hundreds of goats to restaurants and home consumers throughout the month of October. The project has acquired the name “Goatober", because as a result of naturally mating goat, kids are born in the early spring, graze on pastures all summer, and are then ready for harvest in October. Thanks to James Whetlor the project has picked up steam in England and throughout Europe.

=== Heritage Rare Breed Chicken Tour ===
In 2013, Heritage Foods USA began an effort to revive 24 rare, heritage chicken lines and create an alternative market for non-industrially bred chicken. Heritage Foods USA is partnering with Frank Reese of Good Shepard Poultry Ranch, the country’s preeminent poultry farmer, to raise heritage chicken breeds that are on the brink of extinction.

=== Heritage Pigs ===
Each week Heritage Foods processes 200 pasture raised 100% heritage breed pigs including the Red Wattle, Tamworth, Gloucestershire Old Spot, Duroc, and Berkshire. These pigs are sold in cuts to American restaurants from across the USA. The pig program is led by Dr. David Newman and the processing is done by Lou Fantasma at Paradise Locker Meats.

== Advisory board ==
- Mario Batali
- Michael Batterberry
- Sam Edwards III
- Winona La Duke
- Michel Nischan
- Eric Schlosser
- Alice Waters

== Heritage Radio Network ==
In 2009, Patrick Martins founded HeritageRadioNetwork.org, a web-based food radio station, in honor of Carlo Petrini’s Radio Bra Onde Rosse, the second independent radio station in Italy, which broadcast good, clean and fair content in 1974 and 1975. Heritage Radio Network is an independent 501c3 non-profit that goes beyond the issues covered in culinary magazines and television. Heritage Radio Network features more than 30 weekly shows about such topics as food technology, beer, cheese, food history and politics, and cocktails.

== See also ==
- List of food companies
