= Midget White turkey =

Breed of turkey

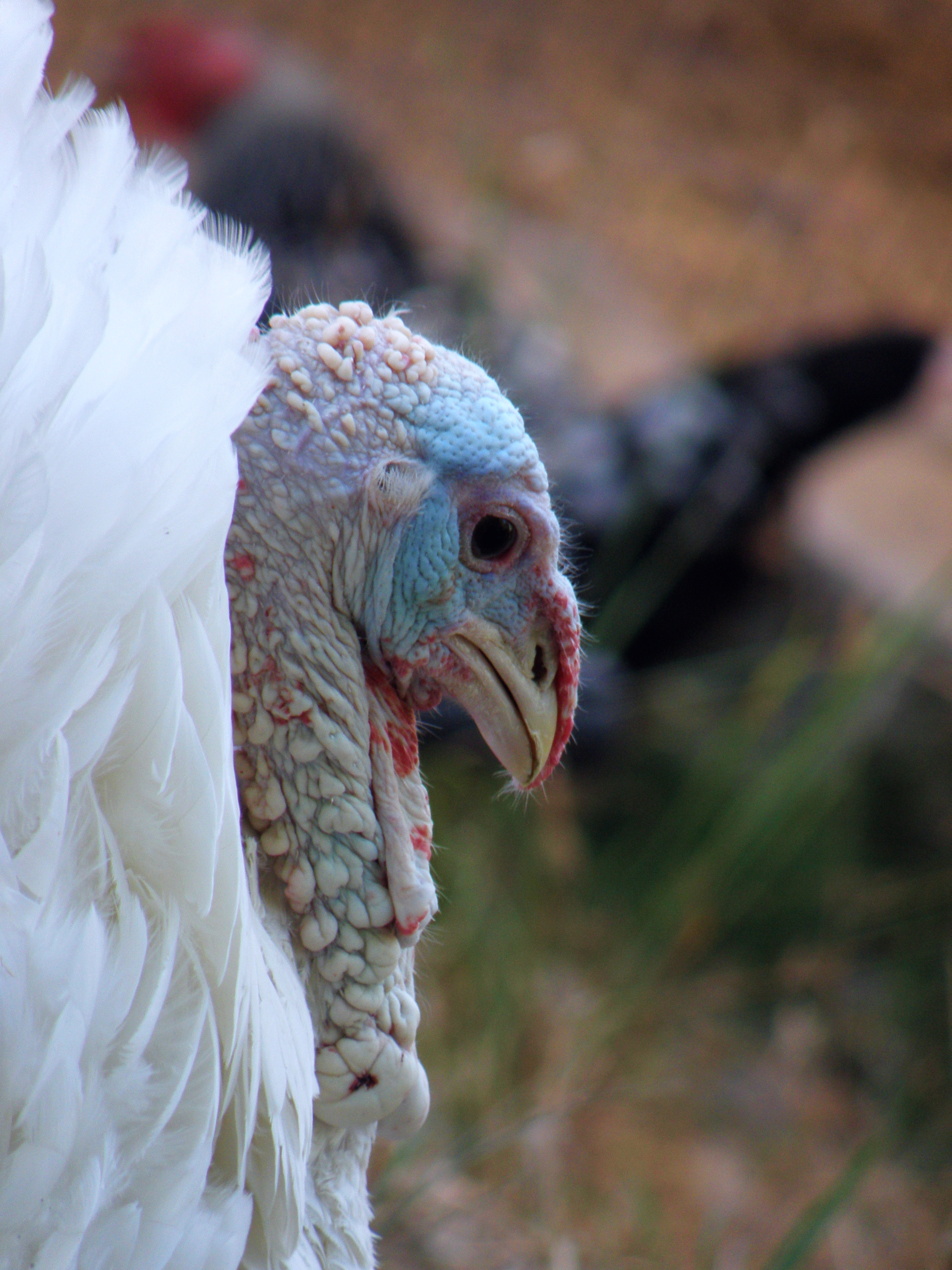
A Midget White tom

The Midget White is a breed of domestic turkey named for its white plumage and small stature. The breed is the smallest standard variety of turkey, and with toms at roughly 13 lbs and hens 8-10 lbs, it weighs only slightly more than the largest chickens.

A rare heritage turkey breed, the Midget White is classified as "Critical" by the American Livestock Breeds Conservancy. It is also included in the Ark of Taste, a catalog of foods in danger of extinction.

The Midget White is sometimes shown in the same class as the Beltsville Small White, but despite the similarity was bred from different lines, mostly white commercial turkeys and the Royal Palm. A newcomer among turkey breeds, it was originally developed in the 1960s by Dr. J. Robert Smyth at the University of Massachusetts Amherst as a smaller complement to the Broad Breasted White. This anticipated demand never surfaced, and along with other rare breeds the Midget White declined as a result. The turkey is relatively friendly and is especially well-suited to being raised on small farms and on a homestead.

The BBC reported in 2014 that Midget White turkeys were thought to be extinct until about 90 of them were found in Alabama.

== See also ==
- List of turkey breeds
