= Dorothy Cann Hamilton =

American chef

Dorothy Cann Hamilton (August 25, 1949 – September 16, 2016) was the founder and CEO of the International Culinary Center, which she founded as The French Culinary Institute (FCI) in 1984. She was also president of the Friends of the USA Pavilion for Expo Milano 2015. WomanzWorld described her as "one of the most influential forces shaping the American culinary landscape today".

== Background ==
Hamilton was born in Manhattan in 1949. She was first introduced to fine French dining while she was studying at the University of Newcastle upon Tyne in England, when she made numerous trips to France.

After graduating with a B.A. honors degree, Hamilton spent three years in the Peace Corps in Thailand where she learned about Asian cuisine. She earned an M.B.A. from New York University Stern Business School.

Hamilton resided with her daughter, dividing their time between New York City and Litchfield County, Connecticut. She died at the age of 67 on September 16, 2016 in a car accident in Cape Breton Island, Nova Scotia, Canada.

== Recent achievements ==
- Awarded the Legion of Honor in 2015 from the government of France.
- Named as a member of the Academy of Distinguished Entrepreneurs by Babson College, inductee November 2015
- Entrepreneur of the Year in 2013 by the International Association of Culinary Professionals for her distinguished career in vocational education and outstanding reputation for creating innovative programs in gastronomy.
- Who’s Who of Food and Beverage in America by the James Beard Foundation
- Silver Spoon Award from Food Arts magazine, recognizing her as a leader in the American restaurant community
- United States representative at Seoul’s 2010 C20 Summit of cultural and political dignitaries
- Chevalier du Mérite Agricole (Agricultural Merit Knighthood) from the French government
- A knighting by the Association Internationale de Maîtres Conseil dans la Gastronomie Française
- The Outstanding American Educator award from Madrid Fusion
- The Diplôme d’Honneur of the Vatel Club des Etats-Unis
- Dame de l’Anée of the Académie Culinaire de France in 2006
- Ordre National du Mérite (National Order of Merit Award) from the French government in 2001

Hamilton was a past Chairman of the Board of the James Beard Foundation and is Chair Emeritus of the American Institute of Food and Wine. She created and hosted Chef’s Story, a weekly radio program on the Heritage Radio Network and a 26-part television series, which aired on PBS in 2007 and is co-author of its companion book.

She conceived textbooks for the school—The Fundamental Techniques of Classic Cuisine, The Fundamental Techniques of Pastry Arts, The Fundamental Techniques of Classic Bread Baking and The Fundamental Techniques of Classic Italian Cuisine, with the first two and the Italian book each receiving James Beard Foundation Awards for best professional cookbook; the pastry book was also acknowledged by the IACP. Her book on culinary careers, Love What You Do: Building a Career in the Culinary Industry was published in the fall of 2009.
