= Heritage Radio Network =

Food radio podcast network

- Established: 2009
- Founder: Patrick Martins
- Headquarters: Brooklyn, NY
- Key people: Caity Moseman Wadler, executive director
- Website: www.heritageradionetwork.org

Heritage Radio Network is an independent 501(c)3 non-profit covering the world of food, drink and agriculture. The member-supported radio station has more than one million monthly listeners in over 200 countries.

== History ==
In 2009, largely inspired by Carlo Petrini and his pirate radio station in Italy, Radio Bra Onde Rosse, Patrick Martins founded the Heritage Radio Network in the back of Roberta's in Bushwick, Brooklyn. The radio studio was built using two re-purposed twenty-foot shipping containers.

Since its inception, Heritage Radio Network has broadcast more than 4,000 shows and produced more than 30 regular weekly programs about such topics as food technology, beer, cheese, food history and politics, and cocktails. Shows feature guests ranging from chefs, food policy analysts, farmers, restaurateurs, musicians and artists. Previous guests have included Alice Waters, Michael Pollan, Joan Dye Gussow, Éric Ripert, Florence Fabricant, Marion Nestle, Danny Meyer, Jamie Oliver, Anthony Bourdain and more. All shows are archived and accessible on the Heritage Radio Network website and through iTunes and Stitcher Radio.

== Programming ==
=== Ongoing series ===
Title	Host(s) / Cast	Topics	Debut
A Taste of the Past	Linda Pelaccio	Culinary History	December 10, 2009
Agave Road Trip	Lou Bank & Chava Periban	Mezcal and Agave Spirits	June 9, 2020
All in the Industry	Shari Bayer	Interviews with the Hospitality Industry	January 8, 2014
Back Bar	Greg Benson	Cocktails and Culinary History	December 15, 2020
Beer Sessions Radio	Jimmy Carbone	Craft Beer and the Brewing Industry	March 12, 2010
Buenlimón Radio	Mariana Velasquez and Diego Senior	Spanish Language Food & Culture	September 10, 2017
Bushwick Podcast	Luke Griffin	Hyperlocal Coverage of the Bushwick Neighborhood	September 27, 2018
Cooking in Mexican from A to Z	Aarón Sanchez, Zarela Martínez	Home Cooking	October 28, 2020
Cooking Issues	Dave Arnold, Nastassia Lopez	Cooking Advice	June 29, 2010
Cutting the Curd	Cara Warren, Diane Stemple, Anne Saxelby (former)	Cheesemaking & the Cheese Industry	June 7, 2009
Eat Your Heartland Out	Capri Cafaro	Culinary History, The American Midwest	July 2, 2020
Eat Your Words	Cathy Erway	Interviews with Cookbook Authors	October 9, 2009
Eating Matters	Jenna Liut	Food Policy and Sustainability	July 11, 2014
Feast Meets West	Lynda Liu	Asian Culture & Food	January 11, 2017
In the Sauce	Alison Cayne	The Business of Consumer Packaged Goods	September 4, 2018
Japan Eats	Akiko Katayama	Japanese Cuisine	May 11, 2015
Meant to be Eaten	Coral Lee	Food & Culture	September 12, 2017
Meat and Three	Caity Moseman Wadler, Kat Johnson	Food News, Food & Culture	May 11, 2018
My Welcome Table	Jessica B. Harris	Culinary History	January 18, 2012
Opening Soon	Jenny Goodman and Alex McCreary	Opening Restaurants	May 7, 2019
Pizza Quest	Peter Reinhart	Professional and Home Pizza Making	May 16, 2021
Processing	Zahra Tangorra & Bobbie Comforto	Conversations about Food & Grief	January 16, 2020
Snacky Tunes	Greg Bresnitz, Darin Bresnitz	Music & Food	July 13, 2009
Soul by Chef Todd Richards	Todd Richards	Southern Food	October 20, 2020
Speaking Broadly	Dana Cowin	Interviews with Women in Food	January 11, 2017
The Big Food Question	HRN Staff	Food News	July 22, 2020
The Farm Report	Lisa Held	American Agriculture	April 5, 2009
The Line	Eli Sussman	Chef Interviews	September 20, 2016
The Speakeasy	Damon Boelte, Sother Teague, Greg Benson	Cocktails and Hospitality	January 12, 2011
Time For Lunch	Hannah Fordin, Harry Rosenblum	Kids	March 27, 2020
What Doesn't Kill You	Katy Keiffer	Food & Agriculture Policy	October 16, 2011

==== Snacky Tunes ====
Hosted by Greg and Darin Bresnitz, a pair of twins with long-running connections to the worlds of hospitality and music, Snacky Tunes is a talk show that pairs interviews with chefs and musicians. Most episodes include live musical performances interspersed with the musicians' interviews.

=== Former and limited-run series ===
Title	Host(s)	Genre	First episode aired	Final episode aired
After the Jump	Grace Bonney	Design	April 9, 2012	December 23, 2014
A Hungry Society	Korsha Wilson	Food Media	September 8, 2017	July 26, 2020
Arts & Seizures	Mike Edison	Music, Counter Culture	May 15, 2011	August 15, 2018
Chef's Table	Dorothy Cann Hamilton	Chef Interviews	May 9, 2012	January 2, 2017
Modernist Breadcrumbs	Michael Harlan Turkell, Nathan Myhrvold, Francisco Migoya	Bread and Baking	October 4, 2017	December 19, 2018

== Awards and accolades ==
In February 2013, Heritage Radio Network was named one of Saveur 100 Favorite things of 2013. Heritage Radio Network is the recipient of a grant from The Julia Child Foundation for Gastronomy and Culinary Arts.
