= Anne Saxelby =

American cheesemonger (1981–2021)

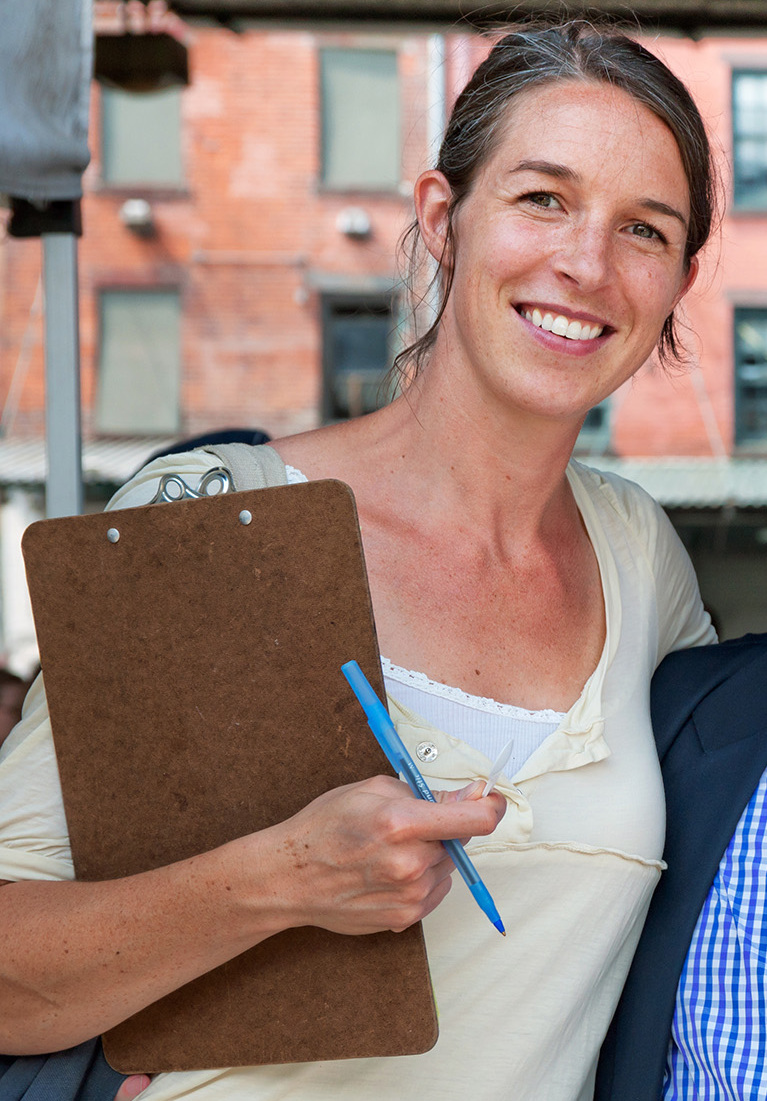
- Anne Saxelby in 2011
- Born: March 25, 1981; Dayton, Ohio
- Died: October 9, 2021 (aged 40); Brooklyn, New York City
- Occupation: Cheesemonger

Anne Therese Saxelby (March 25, 1981 – October 9, 2021) was an American artisanal cheesemaker and cheesemonger. She was the founder of Saxelby Cheesemongers, the first shop dedicated to American artisanal cheeses in New York City. She was a major figure in the growth and promotion of the American artisanal cheese industry.

== Early life and education ==
Anne Saxelby was born in Dayton, Ohio, to Bill Saxelby, an entrepreneur and Pam (Reesman) Saxelby, a children's book author. She was raised in Libertyville, Illinois, and attended Libertyville High School. Her parents knew little about cheese, but Anne wrote a high school thesis on the processes of decay and fermentation of foods. She attended a studio art program at New York University starting in 1999 after moving to New York City.

== Career ==
After completing her degree, Saxelby obtained a job working in cheese production at Cato Corner Farm in 2003. Then she started working at Murray's Cheese and learned how to produce and sell cheese. Her education in cheesemaking continued with an internship in Paris under affineur Hervé Mons. Mons sent her to work at farms throughout France and Italy so she could learn about other cheeses, including goat and sheep's cheese. Returning in order to show that Americans could also make competitive cheese, she opened her first shop, Saxelby Cheesemongers, on May 5, 2006. Saxelby set up her stall in the Essex Market and focused on supplying cheeses only made by small American cheesemakers from the northeastern US.

During the beginnings of the shop stall, Saxelby was the only employee and delivered ordered cheese by bike to locations throughout Manhattan and Brooklyn. The stall was only large enough to hold a temperature controlled refrigerator and Saxelby began by only selling 30 kinds of cheeses from local farmsteads. An additional, larger shop was set up in Chelsea Market in 2017. In order to house the growing amount of cheese supplies, Saxelby bought a warehouse in Red Hook, Brooklyn, with business partner Benoit Breal. The original Essex Market location was closed in 2019 after the closing of the market building and the creation of a replacement market at Essex Crossing that she decided not to move to.

Saxelby was known for assisting local farms and other cheesemakers in gaining other business options and expanding the cheese market in the region. This included assisting in cheese decisions for restaurants in the area that wanted to add artisanal cheeses to their recipes. 173 restaurants in the New York area were a part of her retail business in supplying cheese and offering assistance in cheese menus. She also acted as a representative for the Essex Street Market Vendor Association against poor management of the vendor businesses and the lack of sanitation and promotion of vendors by the New York City Economic Development Corporation.

Her book, The New Rules of Cheese, was published in October 2020 and covers the process of cheesemaking and the using of cheese in life.

Saxelby also illustrated some of her mother's children's books.

== Awards and honors ==
In 2011, Saxelby and her store was awarded the Small Business of the Year title for Manhattan.

== Personal life ==
Saxelby married Patrick Martins, the owner of Heritage Foods USA, in 2012. Together, they had three children, a son and two daughters.

Saxelby died from a heart condition on October 9, 2021.

== Bibliography ==
- Saxelby, Anne (2020). The New Rules of Cheese: A Freewheeling and Informative Guide. Ten Speed Press. ISBN 9781984857897.
