= Royal Palm turkey =

Breed of turkey

Royal Palm
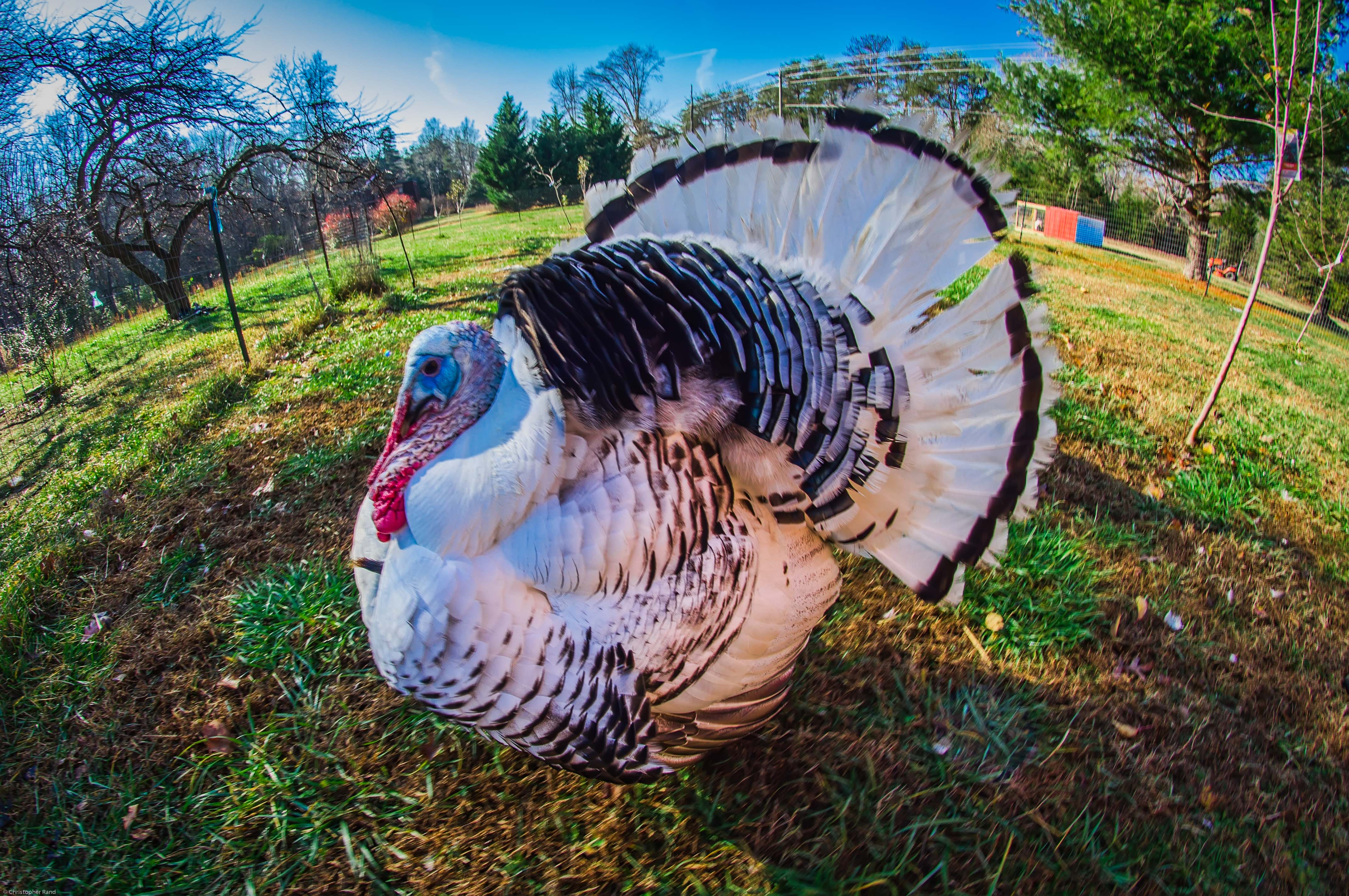
- Country of origin: United States of America

Traits
- Skin color: white with bands of metallic black

Classification
- APA: Heritage breed

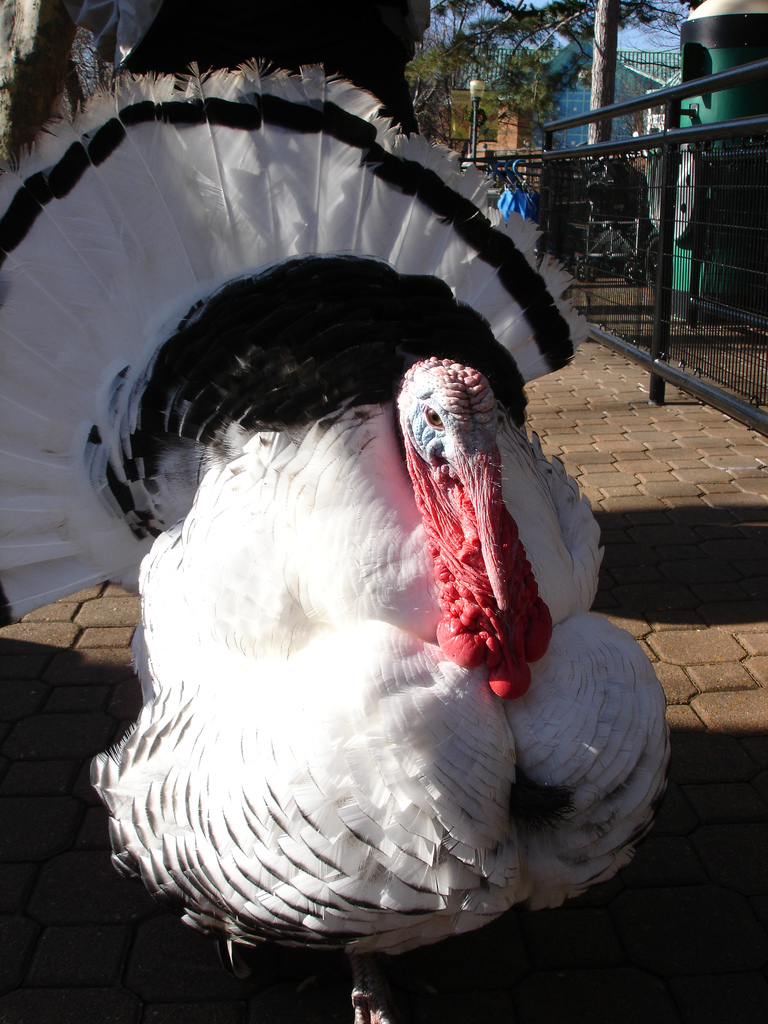
A Royal Palm tom

The Royal Palm is a breed of domestic turkey. It is not primarily selected for meat production, and is usually kept as an ornamental bird with a unique appearance, largely white with bands of metallic black.

The Royal Palm first appeared in the 1920s on a farm in Lake Worth, Florida, apparently as a cross between Black, Bronze, Narragansett, and native turkeys. Years of selective breeding followed to stabilize the coloring, and the Royal Palm was finally accepted by the American Poultry Association's Standard of Perfection in 1971. In Europe, a turkey with similar coloration is sometimes called the Cröllwitzer, Pied, or Black-laced White.

Most heritage turkey breeds declined after the adoption of the Broad Breasted White by the turkey industry; the Royal Palm is an endangered breed and is classified as "watch" by the American Livestock Breeds Conservancy. It is also included in Slow Food USA's Ark of Taste, a catalog of heritage foods in danger of extinction. The Australian and United States both report the breed as endangered to the Food and Agriculture Organization of the United Nations.
