= Fibrominn =

- Country: United States
- Location: Benson, Minnesota
- Coordinates: 45°19′20″N 95°37′48″W
- Status: Decommissioned
- Commission date: October 2007
- Decommission date: November 2018
- Owners: ContourGlobal, LP

Thermal power station
- Primary fuel: Poultry litter

Power generation
- Nameplate capacity: 55-megawatt

Fibrominn, located in Benson, Minnesota, was the first power plant in the United States designed to burn poultry litter as its main source of fuel. It produced 55 megawatts of electric power by burning turkey manure combined with wood chips. All of the energy produced was required by state lawmakers to be purchased by Xcel Energy. The plant was developed by Fibrowatt LLC, part of the Homeland Renewable Energy Group, which was set up by the management team which built the world's first three poultry-litter-fueled power plants (in the UK). Construction began in 2005 and the plant began operating in 2007. Grand opening ceremonies were held on October 12 and 13, 2007. The State of Minnesota required that Xcel purchased power from the plant until at least 2028. The plant at one point had been owned by ContourGlobal, LP.

However, the cost of generating energy from the unique supply of biomass became increasingly costly compared to other renewable sources. In 2017, Xcel Energy successfully lobbied state lawmakers to allow it to buy the plant in order to decommission it because the high cost of operations were being forced onto ratepayers. Xcel noted in regulatory filings that the plant's closure would eventually save ratepayers hundreds of millions of dollars over roughly 10 years.

In 2018, Xcel paid $24.5 million to the plant's owners and was expected to pay the city of Benson as much as $20 million over a period of years to make up for the city's loss of expected revenue once the plant closed. The same year, there was an effort by Brightmark Energy of San Francisco to purchase the plant and convert it for use in generating renewable natural gas from turkey litter and other biomass; however, after 18 months, the project never materialized and the effort failed. The plant was demolished in August 2019.

== See also ==
- Fibrominn LLC
- Fibrominn feature page on Benson, Minnesota web site
- Feature article at KSTP Minneapolis/St. Paul
- "MN power plant that burns turkey poop was once a wonder. Now, it may close."
- "PUC backs Xcel's plan that would result in closing Iron Range, Benson plants"
