= Bourbon Red =

American breed of turkey

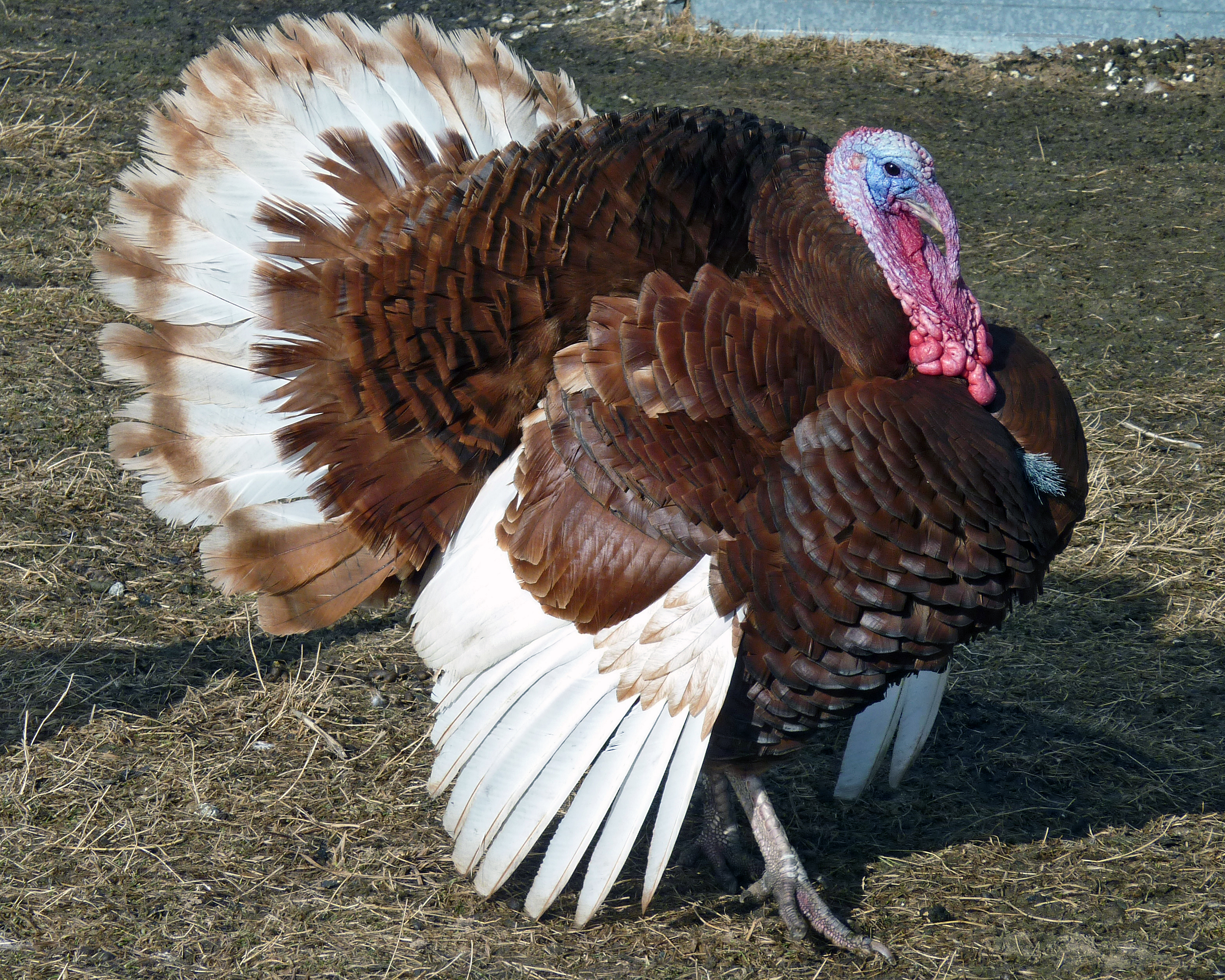
- Bourbon Red turkey tom
- Conservation status: FAO (2007): not at risk; Livestock Conservancy (2022): watch; RBST (2023): priority; DAD-IS (2023): at risk/vulnerable
- Other names: Bourbon Butternut; Bourbon Red Turkey; Kentucky Red; Canela (Uruguay)
- Country of origin: United States
- Distribution: United States; Australia; Canada; Europe; United Kingdom; Uruguay
- Use: meat

Traits
- Weight: Male: 15 kg (33 lb); Female: 8 kg (18 lb)

Classification
- APA: yes
- EE: yes
- PCGB: yes

The Bourbon Red is an American breed of domestic turkey. It is named for its reddish-brown plumage and for its area of origin, Bourbon County, Kentucky, where it was developed in the last years of the nineteenth century. It was accepted into the Standard of Perfection of the American Poultry Association in 1909, and in the early twentieth century was an important commercial meat breed until the Broad Breasted White began to dominate industrial production. The Bourbon Red is considered a heritage turkey; it is an endangered breed, classified as 'watch' by the Livestock Conservancy. It was formerly known as the Bourbon Butternut or as the Kentucky Red.

== History ==
The Bourbon Red was bred in the Bluegrass Region of Kentucky in the late nineteenth century. The breeding work is usually attributed to J.F. Barbee, and is thought to have been based on a particularly dark strain of Buff Turkey from Pennsylvania called the Tuscawara or Tuscarora Red, with some admixture of White Holland and Bronze stock. It was initially called the Kentucky Red or Bourbon Butternut, but became better known once the name Bourbon Red was adopted. It was accepted into the Standard of Perfection of the American Poultry Association in 1909.

In the early twentieth century it was marketed as suitable for commercial production, and soon supplanted the less productive Buff, which became rare and in 1915 was removed from the Standard of Perfection. In the interwar period the Bourbon Red was widely reared, particularly as a farm bird in the Midwest, but numbers declined rapidly after the adoption of the Broad Breasted White for industrial production.

In the twenty-first century numbers recovered and it has become the most numerous of the non-industrial heritage turkey breeds. In 1999 the Society for the Preservation of Poultry Antiquities found approximately 1000 birds, and in 2003 the American Livestock Breeds Conservancy (as it was then known) counted more than 1500. A United States population of 2147 was reported to DAD-IS for 2015, and in 2023 the world-wide population was estimated at 3000. In 2022 the Livestock Conservancy listed the conservation status of the breed as 'watch'.

The Bourbon Red is included in the Ark of Taste of the international Slow Food Foundation. It is recognized by the Entente Européenne in Europe, and by the Poultry Club of Great Britain. It is also reported from Australia, Canada and Uruguay.

== Characteristics ==
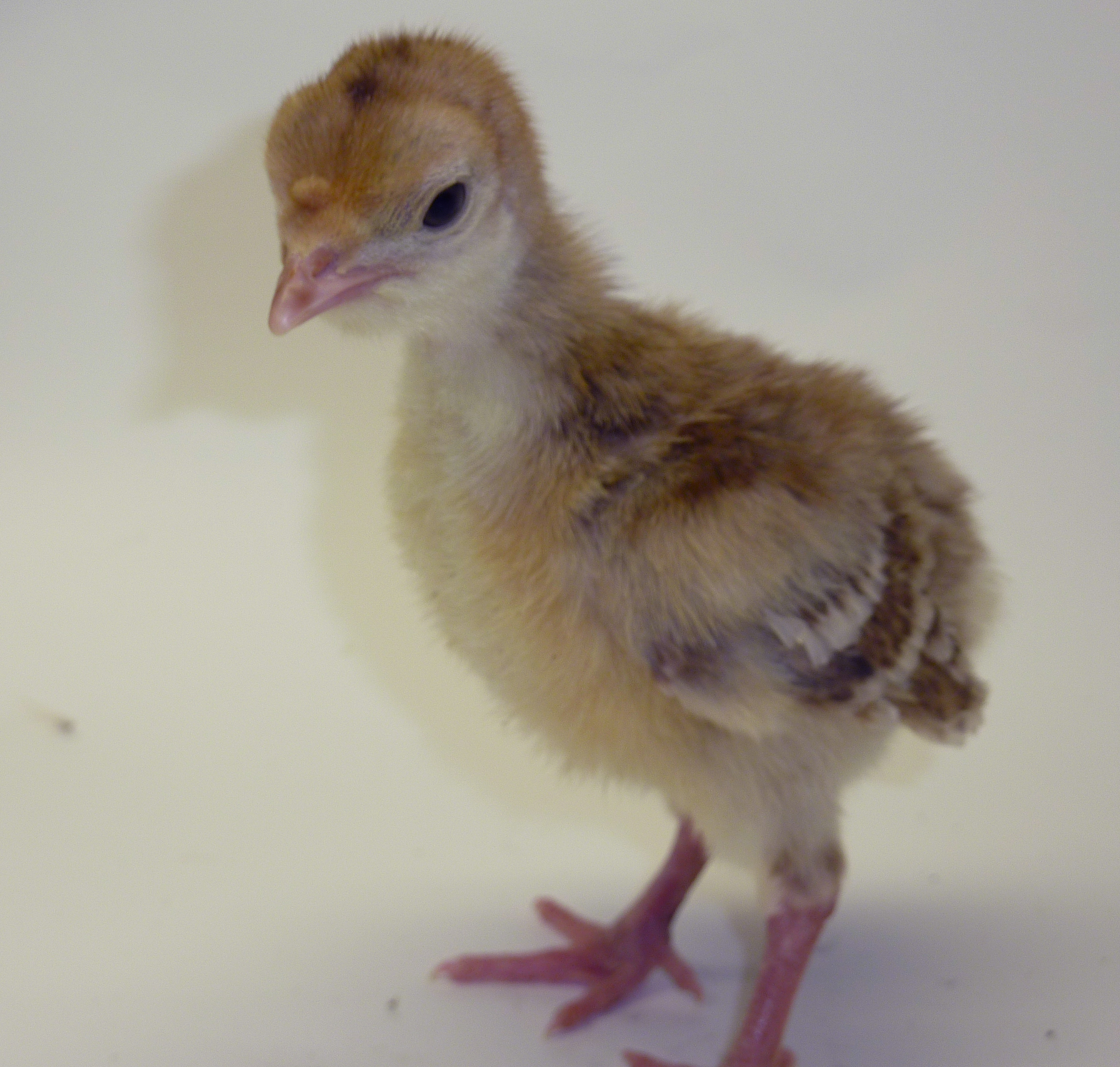
Bourbon Red turkey poult

The Bourbon Red is a tall, high-breasted turkey, characterized by its deep mahogany-red body color. The wing primaries and secondaries are white, as are the main tail feathers. The beak is dark at the base, lightening to a horn-colour at the tip. The shanks and feet are a deep reddish horn in young birds, becoming pink with maturity.

The Livestock Conservancy lists an ideal weight of 15 kg (32 lb) for mature toms (males) and 8 kg (18 lb) for mature hens, while for young birds it gives weights of 10 kg (23 lb) and 6 kg (14 lb) respectively. As for many years there has been little or no selective breeding for productive charactistics, many birds are likely to reach lower weights.
