= The Livestock Conservancy =

US organization for heritage livestock breeds

- Founded: 1977
- Tax ID no.: ID# 03 0270 281
- Purpose: Rare breed livestock preservation
- Location: Pittsboro, North Carolina, US
- Region served: United States
- Members: 3,000
- Key people: Director: Alison Martin; Chair: Patricia Johnston; Vice Chair: Jay Calvert; Secretary: Richard Browning, Ph.D.
- Website: livestockconservancy.org
- Formerly called: American Minor Breeds Conservancy, American Livestock Breeds Conservancy

The Livestock Conservancy, formerly known as the American Livestock Breeds Conservancy (ALBC) and prior to that, the American Minor Breeds Conservancy, is a nonprofit organization focused on preserving and promoting rare breeds, also known as "heritage breeds" of livestock. Founded in 1977, through the efforts of livestock breed enthusiasts concerned about the disappearance of many of the US's heritage livestock breeds, The Livestock Conservancy was the pioneer livestock preservation organization in the United States, and remains a leading organization in that field. It has initiated programs that have saved multiple breeds from extinction, and works closely with similar organizations in other countries, including Rare Breeds Canada. With 3,000 members, a staff of eleven and a 19-member board of directors, the organization has an operating budget of over a million dollars.

The Livestock Conservancy maintains a conservation priority list that divides endangered breeds of horses, asses, sheep, goats, cattle, rabbits, pigs and poultry into five categories based on population numbers and historical interest. The organization has published several books, and works with breed registries and other groups on several aspects of breed preservation, including genetic testing, historical documentation, animal rescue and marketing. Preservation of genetic material is of special interest to the Conservancy, and for a period of time it maintained a gene bank that was later transferred to the United States Department of Agriculture. It has also developed and published several heritage definitions, including parameters for heritage breeds of cattle and poultry.

In large part due to the efforts of the organization, heritage turkey populations have increased more than tenfold in little over a decade, and several breeds that once stood on the brink of extinction now maintain healthy populations. The organization also sustains programs that deal with preserving and promoting endangered cattle and pig breeds, as well as breed-specific programs relating to many of its livestock categories. Breeds that The Livestock Conservancy has assisted in saving include the Carolina Marsh Tacky horse, Randall cattle, Red Wattle hogs and the American rabbit.

== History and organization ==
In the 1960s and 1970s, American livestock breed enthusiasts, including scientists, farmers, and historians, became increasingly aware of the disappearance of many traditional livestock breeds in the US. This awareness was partially due to difficulties encountered in obtaining heritage breeds for living history sites. This was particularly evident when historians were searching for historically authentic breeds to display at the Old Sturbridge Village in Massachusetts and were unable to find sheep of the Vermont strain of Merino, as they had gone extinct. As a result, these historians and others decided to attempt preservation of other rare breeds facing extinction. On March 16, 1977, the American Minor Breeds Conservancy was incorporated in Vermont. It was the first United States organization focused on preserving rare breeds of livestock and promoting genetic diversity among livestock breeds, and remains the preeminent organization in this field in the United States. A similar organization in Great Britain, the Rare Breeds Survival Trust, had been formed in 1973. The organization conducted its first comprehensive survey of American livestock breeds in 1985. Since then, the survey has been repeated every five years, with the status of endangered breeds being monitored in between. The initial survey was called "the most comprehensive assessment of livestock genetic resources ever conducted in the United States". In 1986, a fellow organization, Rare Breeds Canada, was formed, and the two bodies have worked together closely to preserve and promote breeds that have populations in the US and Canada. In 1993, the organization changed its name to the American Livestock Breeds Conservancy (ALBC). In 2013, the organization again shortened its name to "The Livestock Conservancy".

The Livestock Conservancy is headquartered in Pittsboro, North Carolina. Its mission is to protect "genetic diversity in livestock and poultry species through the conservation and promotion of endangered breeds." It organizes and participates in programs to rescue threatened populations, educate the public about rare breeds and genetic diversity, support breeders and breed associations, perform research on endangered breeds and assist gene banks in preserving genetic material. The Conservancy includes among its partners and members the Oklahoma City Zoo, which maintains the Children's Zoo, a petting zoo and children's museum that holds members of eight rare livestock breeds; and Colonial Williamsburg, a living-history museum that maintains populations of ten rare breeds.

According to its literature, the Livestock Conservancy is funded by grants, sales of publications and promotional materials, membership dues and public donations. Publications sold include books on conservation and genetics, livestock husbandry, farming operations and breed guides. In the 1998 fiscal year, the organization claimed slightly over US$308,000 in income, coming mainly from public donations and membership dues, but also including service revenue, investment income and sales of goods. By 2009, this amount had jumped to slightly more than US$440,000, mainly from donations, grants and service revenue, but also including investment income. In 1998, the organization claimed slightly over US$288,000 in expenses, allocated mainly to program services, but with just under US$30,000 stemming from management, fundraising and general expenses. By 2009, expenses stood at almost US$490,000, spent mostly on employee salaries, benefits and other compensation (which includes program service expenses), but with almost US$150,000 stemming from management, fundraising and general expenses. The organization claims around 3,000 members as of 2023, a number up from 2,300 in 1989. It operates with a staff of eleven, headed by an executive director, and a nineteen-member board of directors.

== General programs ==
The preservation of various pure breeds and strains, including some that are rare today, was once undertaken in North America in large part by large agriculture-focused colleges and universities. However, many of these institutions have changed their focus to commercial or crossbred strains, with many herds being sent to slaughter. The Livestock Conservancy and Rare Breeds Canada intervened in some of these cases, leading to the survival and preservation of some gene stocks. The United States Department of Agriculture (USDA) participates in livestock preservation mainly through technology-based approaches such as gene mapping and germplasm (genetic material) storage. However, although the storage of genetic material is a useful technique in the preservation of rare breeds, it cannot preserve the entire range of genetic diversity within even an individual breed, and stored material cannot react and adapt to environmental or biological changes as live animal populations can. The US federal government rarely supports rare breed live animal population conservation, and while agricultural subsidies were once seen more than they are in present times, they were never focused on individual breeds. The Livestock Conservancy has been instrumental in preserving live populations of many rare livestock breeds in the US.

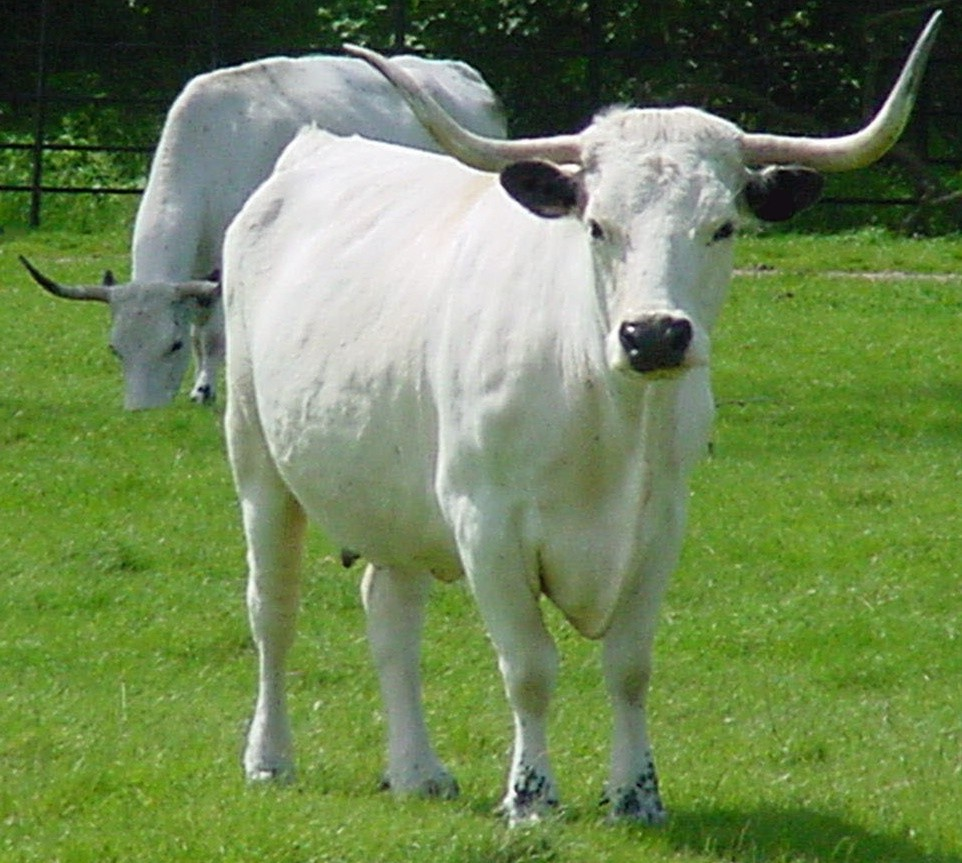
White Park cows, considered to be "threatened"

In the 1980s, the Conservancy began a gene bank designed to preserve the genetic material of rare breeds. After collecting genetic material from over a dozen rare breeds, the bank was transferred to the USDA National Animal Germplasm Program (NAGP). It maintains a close relationship with the NAGP, including assisting in the collection of genetic material from additional rare breeds. The conservation list published by the Conservancy is also used by the SVF Foundation, an organization that uses cryopreservation to preserve germplasm from rare breeds. In the early 1990s, the organization mounted displays of historic rare breed livestock illustrations at the National Agricultural Library and the Carnegie Museum of Natural History, designed to raise public awareness of the declining populations of rare livestock breeds.

In 2004, the Livestock Conservancy entered a partnership with Slow Food USA, Chefs Collaborative, and four other organizations to found the Renewing America's Food Traditions collaboration. The effort resulted in a book, Renewing America's Food Traditions, describing more than 1,000 varieties and species of food that are disappearing from the United States. The organization has written or published over a dozen books on heritage livestock breeds, including several on heritage poultry and waterfowl and more on general livestock conservation. Its conservation criteria and literature on livestock biodiversity are also widely used in independent publications on breeds. The Conservancy organizes an annual conference that focuses on the preservation and promotion of rare livestock breeds. For this conference, it partners with other organizations to teach members and other attendees about various aspects of rare breed livestock. For instance, in 2005, the organization partnered with the NAGP and the American Grassfed Association for a discussion on the cryogenic preservation of rare breed genetic material, which included a tour of the USDA Livestock and Poultry Gene Bank. In 2009, the Conservancy set up an online classified advertisement system to help users find and purchase rare breeds.

=== Heritage breeds ===
The Livestock Conservancy has released three definitions of heritage breeds, pertaining to turkeys, chickens and cattle. Heritage turkeys are defined by the organization as breeds that live longer, grow slower and can mate naturally, with the latter requirement being one of the most important as it is not met by many industrially grown, mass-produced breeds. In 2009, a definition for heritage chickens was released that is similar to the one for turkeys – breeds are required to be considered "standard" by the American Poultry Association, be long-lived and slow-growing, and able to mate naturally. The latter is less of a concern in chickens than in turkeys, as artificial insemination has not progressed as far in the development of industrial chicken farming. In late 2010, the Conservancy released a definition of "heritage cattle", to follow their earlier heritage turkey description. Requirements for heritage cattle breeds include having a long history in the US, being purebred, and being a true genetic breed. Specifications for heritage milk and beef, as well as products made from them, were also released with the definition.

As of 2010, the Conservancy was undertaking several programs to help breeders and the public understand the need for and the way to preserve heritage breeds. As the number of expert livestock breeders continues to dwindle, the Master Breeders' Apprentice Program aims to supplement their number by educating competent and interested members of the public. Through the Breed Rescue and Conservation Acquisition Program, the organization works with breeders and breed registries to begin and sustain conservation programs for rare livestock breeds. The Southeastern Livestock Breed Initiative aims to expand and reintroduce rare breeds from the American southeast, combining traditional breeds with low-impact farming (agriculture that has a lesser impact on the environment than high-intensity commercial farming) to assist in restarting the small, niche market farming that once existed in the area. In 2014, the Conservancy published the book An Introduction to Heritage Breeds describing conserving and care of animals under the purview of the organization, detailing each breed's specific needs and characteristics.

== Conservation Priority List ==
The Conservation Priority List (CPL) is the Conservancy's list of breeds for which conservation is a priority. Published annually, the list is used as the foundation for all conservation work done by the organization. Each year, it gathers population data on all breeds of livestock, including registration data and, for poultry, census numbers gathered from members, hatcheries and breeders. This data is then used to divide breeds into five categories: critical, threatened, watch, recovering and study. Breeds are placed in the first three categories based on annual registrations with breed registries in the United States and estimated global populations.

Conservation priority criteria
		Critical	Threatened	Watch
Livestock	Annual registrations in US	below 200	below 1,000	below 2,500
Livestock	Global population	below 2,000	below 5,000	below 10,000
Poultry	Annual registrations in US	below 500, 5 or fewer flocks	below 1,000, 7 or fewer flocks	below 5,000, 10 or fewer flocks
Poultry	Global population	below 1,000	below 5,000	below 10,000
Rabbits	Annual registrations in US	below 50	below 100	below 200
Rabbits	Global population	below 500	below 1,000	below 2,000

Recovering breeds are those that have exceeded the numbers needed for the watch category but that the organization still wishes to monitor. Breeds in the study category lack genetic or historical documentation but are still considered to be of genetic interest. Population numbers may be lacking on these breeds, or proof that they are a true breed, instead of a type or non-true-breeding cross.

As of 2024, the Conservation Priority List has: 21 cattle breeds (7 critical, 6 threatened, 2 watch, 4 recovering, 2 in study), 32 horse breeds (16c, 7t, 1r, 1s), 3 donkey breeds (2c, 1w), 9 pig breeds (4c, 4t, 1r), 21 sheep breeds (6c, 10t, 6w, 1r), 5 goat breeds (2c, 3r), and 5 rabbit breeds (5c, 5t, 7w, 4r). As for fowl breeds, the 2024 CPL has: 51 chicken breeds (11c, 16t, 17w, 5r, 2s), 15 duck breeds (3c, 2t, 9w, 1r), 13 geese breeds (4c, 3t, 5w, 1s), and 8 turkey breeds (2t, 6w).

== Breed programs ==
Equine breeds, such as the American Cream Draft, were among the reasons that the organization was formed, and were on the earliest conservation priority lists. The Conservancy has assisted in extensive genetic studies of rare horse breeds, focusing particularly on strains of the Colonial Spanish Horse. Rabbits, having only been added to the CPL in 2005, have been among the least studied, although in 2010, the organization named the American Rabbit as the most endangered breed of rabbit in the US. Work with cattle has also been limited, although in one case, a member rescued the last of the Randall Cattle herd from slaughter; the breed has since been built up to more than 300 members. One major initiative with cattle is the Heritage Dairy Cattle Breed Recovery program, which assists heritage cattle breeders and breed organizations with funding, marketing and communications, with a focus on selling their product to other small operations, including cheese and dairy operations.

=== Horses ===
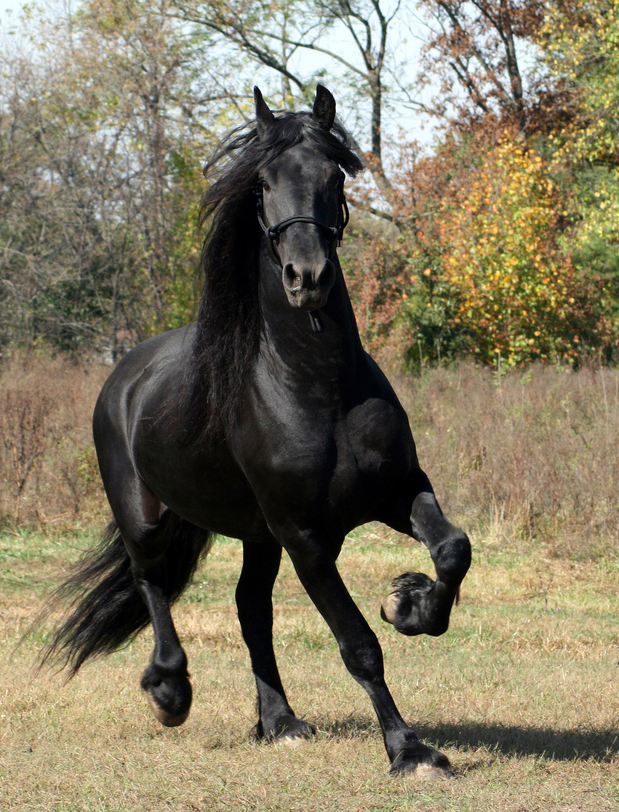
The Friesian horse is a breed listed as recovering.

In 2006, the Livestock Conservancy began investigating the Carolina Marsh Tacky to see if it was truly a descendant of colonial Spanish stock, and during the organization's initial field investigations it was found that many surviving members of the breed fit the physical type for Spanish horses. In 2007, the organization partnered with the Equus Survival Trust in a project to preserve the breed that included DNA sampling, the creation of a new studbook and mapping the genetics of the breed. The Conservancy participated in the rescue of the Wilbur Cruce strain of Colonial Spanish horse when the area in which it lived was to be turned over to a land conservation program that required domestic animals to be removed. After the rescue, a conservation plan was developed for the animals and small breeding groups of horses were placed with responsible parties. It also assisted in formulating a conservation and breeding strategy for a strain of Colonial Spanish horses from Santa Cruz Island in California. This support helped the horses to become recognized and registrable with the Colonial Spanish registry.

=== Sheep and goats ===
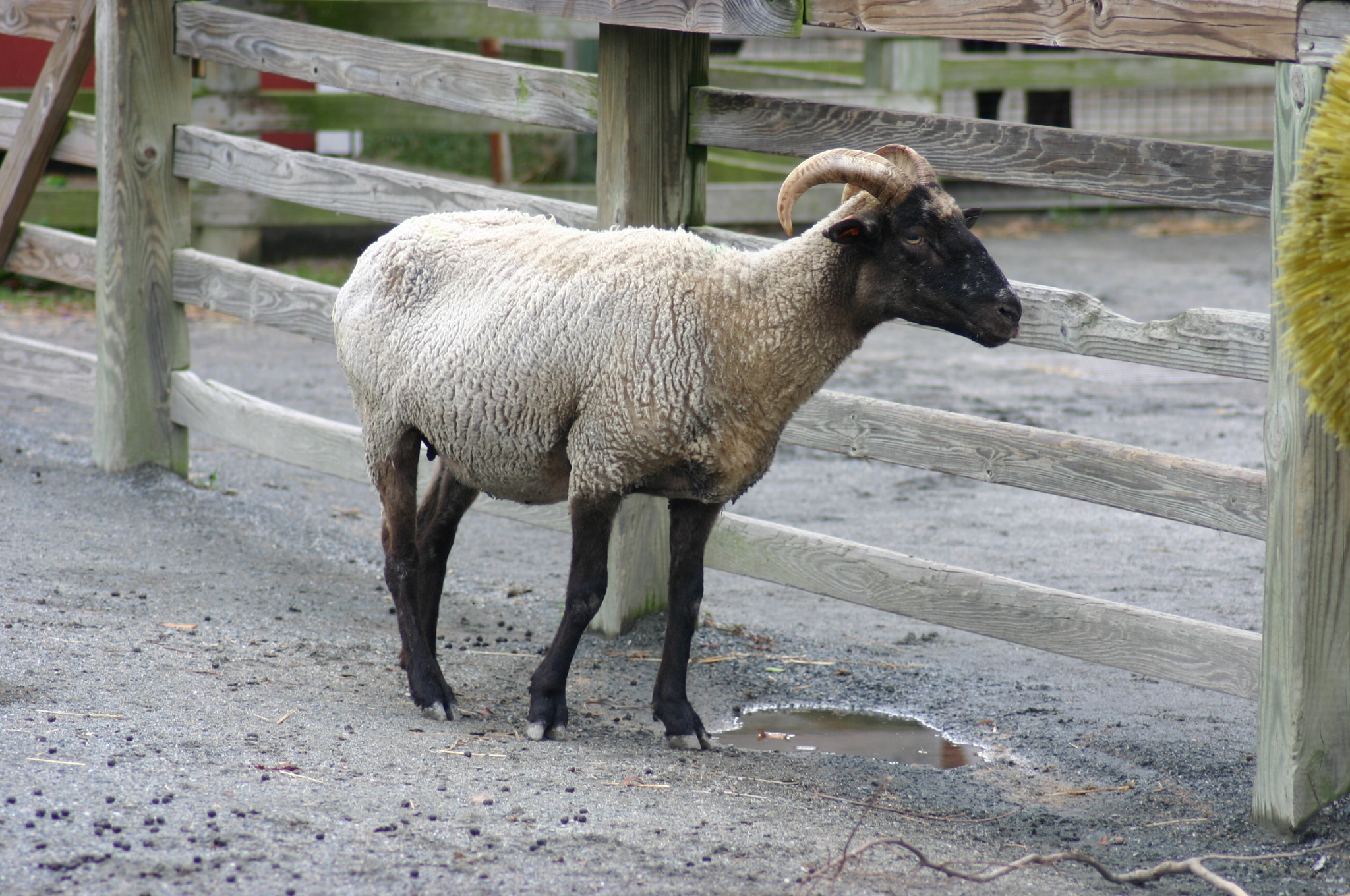
A Hog Island ewe, a breed listed as critical

In December 1987, the Conservancy performed one of its first breed rescues when it removed a viable population of Santa Cruz sheep from Santa Cruz Island. The sheep were in danger of being eradicated by The Nature Conservancy, which was working to save indigenous vegetation that the breed used as food. The first twelve lambs were removed from the island in 1988, with further animals brought to the mainland in 1991. The population now stands at 125 animals and is considered an important genetic resource due to its island heritage, which kept it isolated from other breeds and forced it to adapt to adverse conditions.

Beginning in the early 1990s, the Conservancy worked to preserve the San Clemente Island goat, a rare Spanish-descended breed from California. In 1991, it added genetic material from the San Clemente to their genetic database, later transferred to the National Animal Germplasm Program. As of June 2010, the organization was working on the rescue of a group of feral Spanish goats from an island in South Carolina. There are less than 2,500 members of the breed in the United States, and the island group is one of only two bloodlines known to exist in the southeastern US. Conservancy members first made trips to the island to document and photograph the herd of around 30 goats, then undertook action to remove some goats from the island to preserve the bloodlines from threatened extinction. A small flock was established in a nature preserve just south of Murrells Inlet, South Carolina, and as of June 2010 plans were in place for satellite herds to be established.

=== Pigs ===
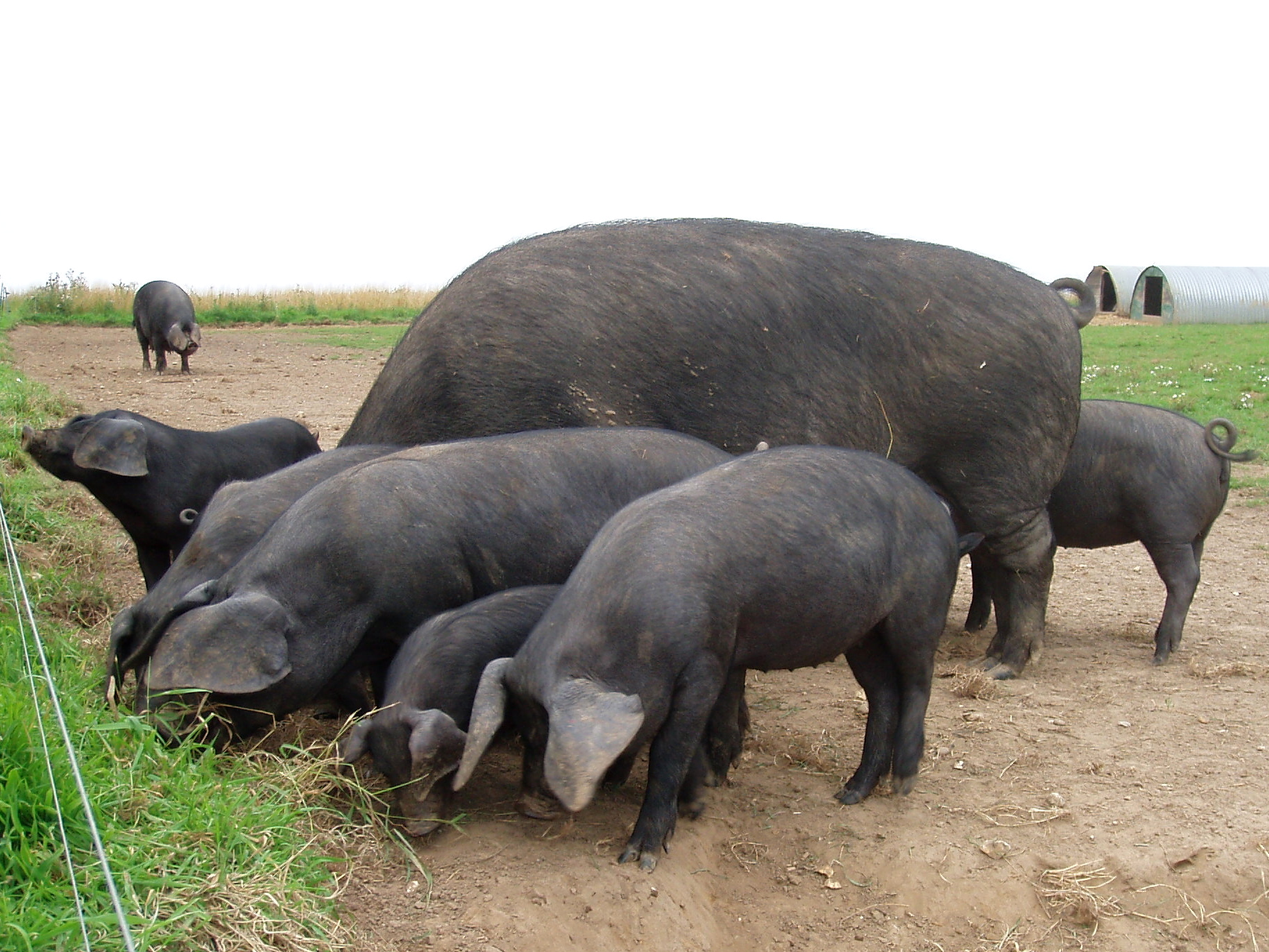
A group of Large Black pigs, listed at critical status

In the course of its breed surveys and monitoring, the Conservancy has found significant changes in the populations of several swine breeds. The Berkshire breed has increased significantly in number, partially due to international demand for its meat, while other breeds have shown significant decreases, most likely due to increasing consolidation of the pork industry to large producers who use only a few specialized pork strains. Breeds such as the Chester White and Poland China have seen population numbers reduced by over 25 percent between 1998 and 2003, while the Hampshire and Yorkshire breeds have decreased by more than 30 percent in the same time.

The Conservancy has been involved with the Red Wattle hog since the 1980s. At that time, the breed had a thriving population, stock was registered by three different breed registries, and breeders resisted suggestions from the organization to create a unified breed registry. However, between 1990 and 1999, purebred stock diminished from 272 animals to just 42 pigs held by six breeders, and in 2000, it was asked to create a unified breed registry for the Red Wattle Hog. Three hogs were registered in the first year, but the next year 90 hogs and three breeders were represented and a breed association was created. By 2008, 111 breeding stock hogs had been registered and 56 breeders were part of the Red Wattle Hog Association.

In November 2008, the Conservancy started the Rare Breed Swine Initiative, which, in cooperation with other organizations, assists in training breeders and cultivating the rare breed pig market. The three main foci of the initiative are marketing breeding stock and products, conserving bloodlines and supporting breed associations. As of 2010, proposals were in place for the funding of a study of porcine genetics, including variability and relationships among breeds, with the aims of maintaining genetic variability among rare pig breeds and releasing a definition of heritage pork.

=== Poultry ===
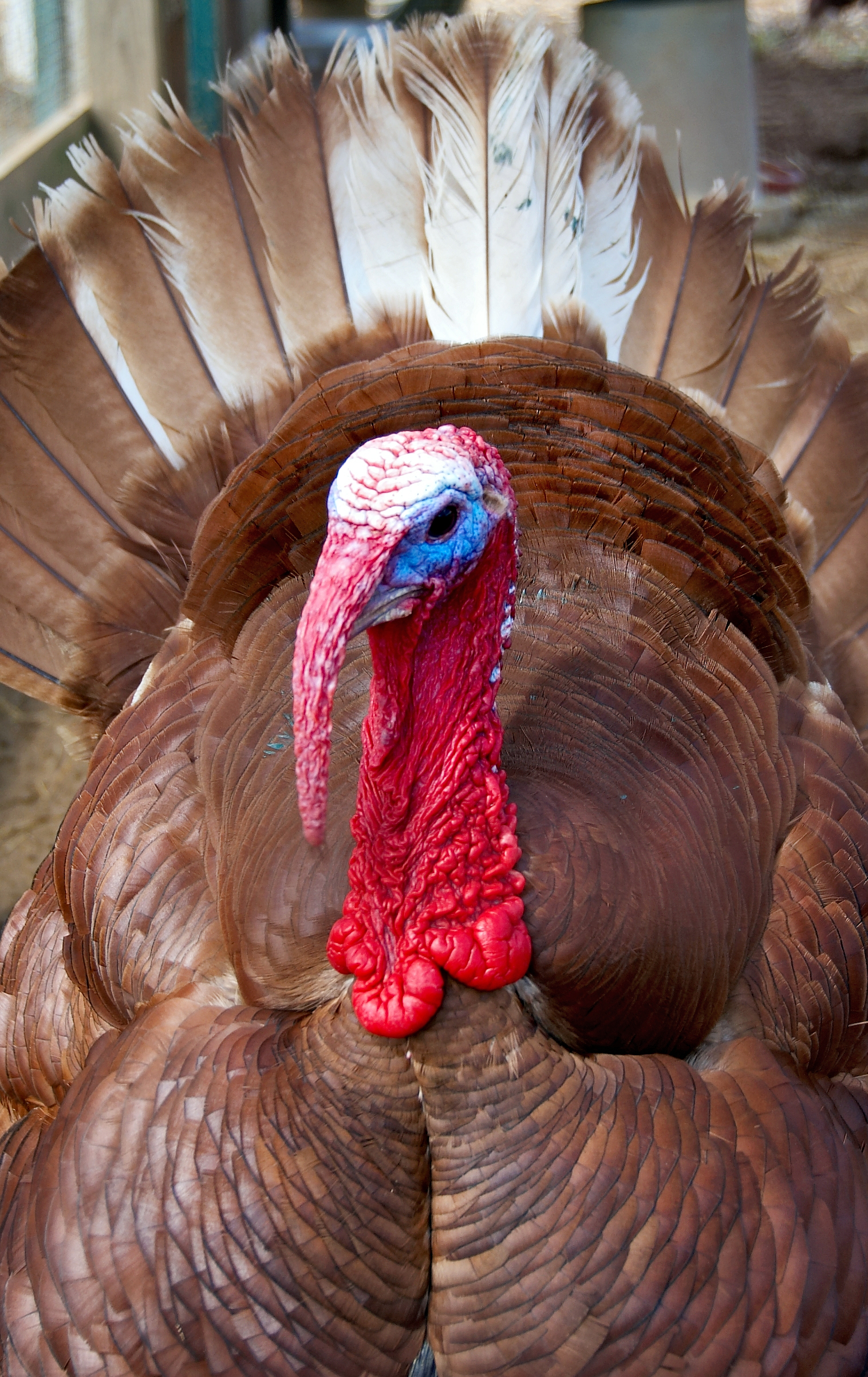
A Bourbon Red turkey, designated as watch status

A breeding program for Buckeye chickens was developed in 2005 by staff members, focusing on using selective breeding to improve the breed and expand its numbers. In 2011, the Buckeye was able to be moved from "critical" status to "threatened", based on a 2010 census that found almost 2,500 birds. The program has since become the template for similar programs focusing on the preservation of other rare chicken breeds.

Heritage turkey breeds have been a focus for the organization since 1997, when a survey showed only 1,335 breeding stock birds of all breeds. A study conducted by the Conservancy and Virginia Tech concluded that heritage turkey breeds had stronger immune systems than those breeds typically used by industrial growers, and as such were more likely to survive disease epidemics. This study and other programs increased awareness of heritage turkey breeds and by 2003 the breeding population stood at 4,275 turkeys of all breeds. By 2007 this had grown to more than 10,000 birds and 17 breeds were no longer considered to be almost extinct. As of 2010, the number is estimated to be close to 15,000.

In 2008 the Conservancy partnered with Slow Food USA and other organizations to conduct a blind taste test of nine breeds of turkeys – eight heritage breeds and one standard industrially grown breed. When the final scores were read, first place went to the Midget White Turkey, second to the Bourbon Red and last place to the Butterball – the single non-heritage breed. This was the largest taste test among turkey breeds to date, and several of the heritage breeds were later added to the Slow Food USA Ark of Taste.
