= Tutti frutti =

Confectionery containing candied fruits

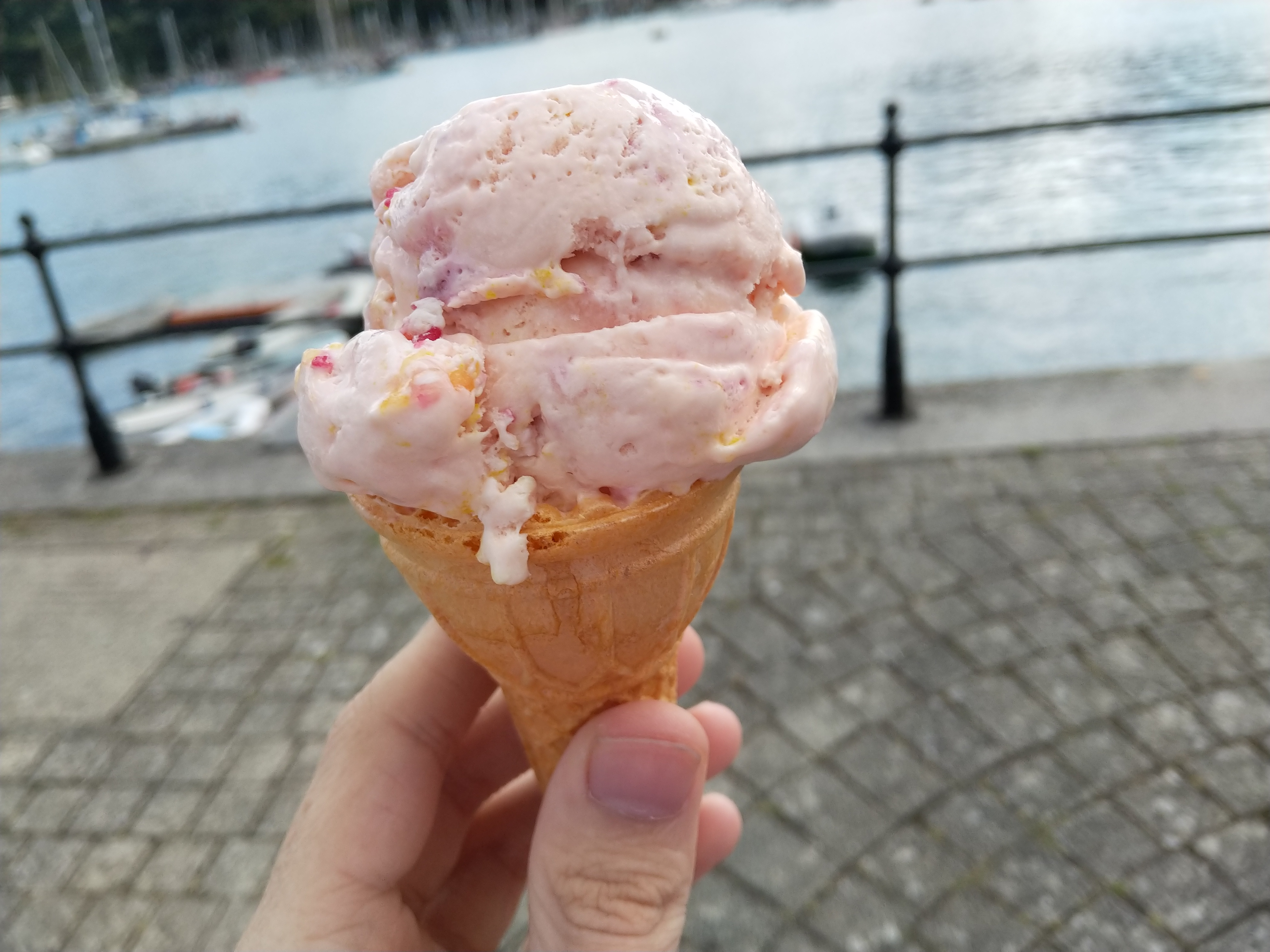
- Main ingredients: Candied fruits or fruit flavourings

Tutti frutti (from Italian tutti i frutti, 'all fruits'; also hyphenated tutti-frutti) is a colourful confectionery containing various chopped and usually candied fruits, or an artificial or natural flavouring simulating the combined flavour of many different fruits and vanilla.

It is a popular ice cream flavour in many Western countries. Fruits used for tutti frutti ice cream include cherries, watermelon, raisins, and pineapple, often augmented with nuts.

In the Netherlands, tutti-frutti (also "tutti frutti" or "tuttifrutti") is a compote of dried fruits, served as a dessert or a side dish to a meat course. In Belgium, tutti-frutti is often seen as a dessert. Typically, it contains a combination of raisins, currants, apricots, prunes, dates, and figs.

In the United States, tutti frutti can also refer to fruits soaked in brandy or other spirits, or even to fruit fermented in a liquid containing sugar and yeast.

In Finland and Sweden, Tutti Frutti is a fruit candy mix produced by Fazer.

== History ==
=== Ice cream ===
Tutti frutti ice cream has been served for at least 165 years, as it appeared on the bill of fare for an 1860 dinner in England. Recipes for tutti frutti ice cream were found in cookbooks of the late 19th century. A tutti frutti ice cream recipe was included in the 1874 cookbook Common Sense in the Household: A Manual of Practical Housewifery This recipe calls for actual tutti frutti and is not fancifully named. In the 1883 cookbook The Chicago Herald Cooking School there is also a tutti frutti ice cream recipe. Many restaurant menus circa 1900 in the collection of the New York Public Library also list this variety of ice cream while at least one early-20th-century American cookbook contains a suggestion that tutti frutti ice cream was popular in the United States. The Italian Cookbook contains a recipe for Tutti Frutti Ice and says, "This is not the tutti frutti ice cream as is known in America."

=== Other ===
In 1888, one of the first gum flavors to be sold in a vending machine, created by the Adams New York Gum Company, was tutti frutti.

A 1928 cookbook, Seven Hundred Sandwiches by Florence A. Cowles (published in Boston), includes a recipe for a "Tutti Frutti Sandwich" with a spread made of whipped cream, dates, raisins, figs, walnuts, and sugar.
