= BLT =

Bacon, lettuce, and tomato sandwich

BLT sandwich
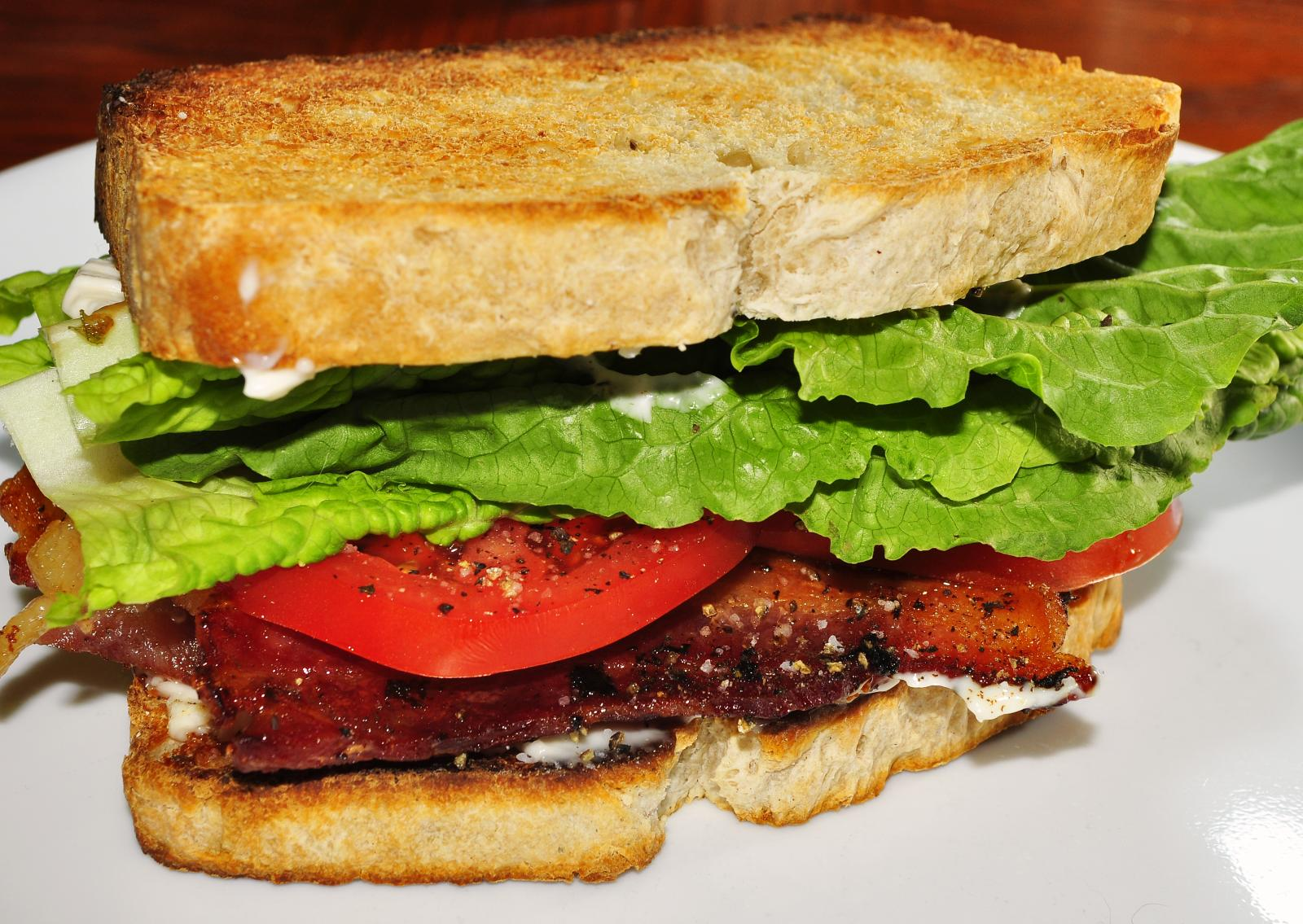
- A BLT sandwich on toast
- Alternative names: Bacon, lettuce, and tomato
- Place of origin: United States
- Main ingredients: Bacon, lettuce, tomato, bread
- Variations: Club sandwich
- Food energy (per serving): 350 kcal (1,500 kJ)
Nutritional value
(per serving)
- Protein: 16 g
- Fat: 34 g
- Carbohydrate: 42 g

A BLT is a type of sandwich, named for the initials of its primary ingredients: bacon, lettuce, and tomato. It can be made with varying recipes according to personal preference. Simple variants include using different types of lettuce or tomatoes, toasting or not, or adding mayonnaise. More pronounced variants include using turkey bacon or tofu in place of regular bacon, removing the lettuce entirely, or adding other ingredients such as a fried egg, avocado (BLAT), or sprouts.

== History ==
Although its ingredients have existed for many years, there is little evidence of BLT sandwich recipes before 1900. In the 1903 Good Housekeeping Everyday Cook Book, a recipe for a club sandwich included bacon, lettuce, tomato, mayonnaise and a slice of turkey sandwiched between two slices of bread. While the 1928 book Seven Hundred Sandwiches by Florence A. Cowles includes a section on bacon sandwiches, the recipes often include pickles and none contain tomato.

The BLT became popular after World War II because of the rapid expansion of supermarkets, which made its ingredients available year-round. The initials, representing "bacon, lettuce, tomato", likely began in the U.S. restaurant industry as shorthand for the sandwich, but it is unclear when this transferred to the public consciousness. For example, a 1951 edition of the Saturday Evening Post makes reference to the sandwich, although it does not use its initials, describing a scene in which: "On the tray, invariably, are a bowl of soup, a toasted sandwich of bacon, lettuce and tomato, and a chocolate milk shake."

A 1954 issue of Modern Hospital contains a meal suggestion that includes: "Bean Soup, Toasted Bacon Lettuce and Tomato Sandwich, Pickles, Jellied Banana Salad, Cream Dressing, and Pound Cake." By 1958, Hellmann's Mayonnaise advertised their product as "traditional on bacon, lettuce, and tomato sandwiches", suggesting that the combination had been around for some time. However, there are several references to a "B.L.T." in the early 1970s, including in one review of Bruce Jay Friedman's play entitled Steambath titled: "A B.L.T. for God – hold the mayo." The abbreviation used in title references a line of dialogue in the play in which God yells, "Send up a bacon and lettuce and tomato sandwich, hold the mayo. You burn the toast, I'll smite you down with my terrible swift sword."

=== Popularity ===
According to a 2019 poll by YouGov, it is the fifth-most popular sandwich in the United States, tying with the ham sandwich and falling behind the roast beef sandwich, turkey sandwich, grilled chicken sandwich, and grilled cheese sandwich. A 2008 poll by OnePoll showed that the BLT was the "nation's favourite" sandwich in the UK. BLT sandwiches are popular especially in the summer, following the tomato harvest.

== Ingredients and preparation ==
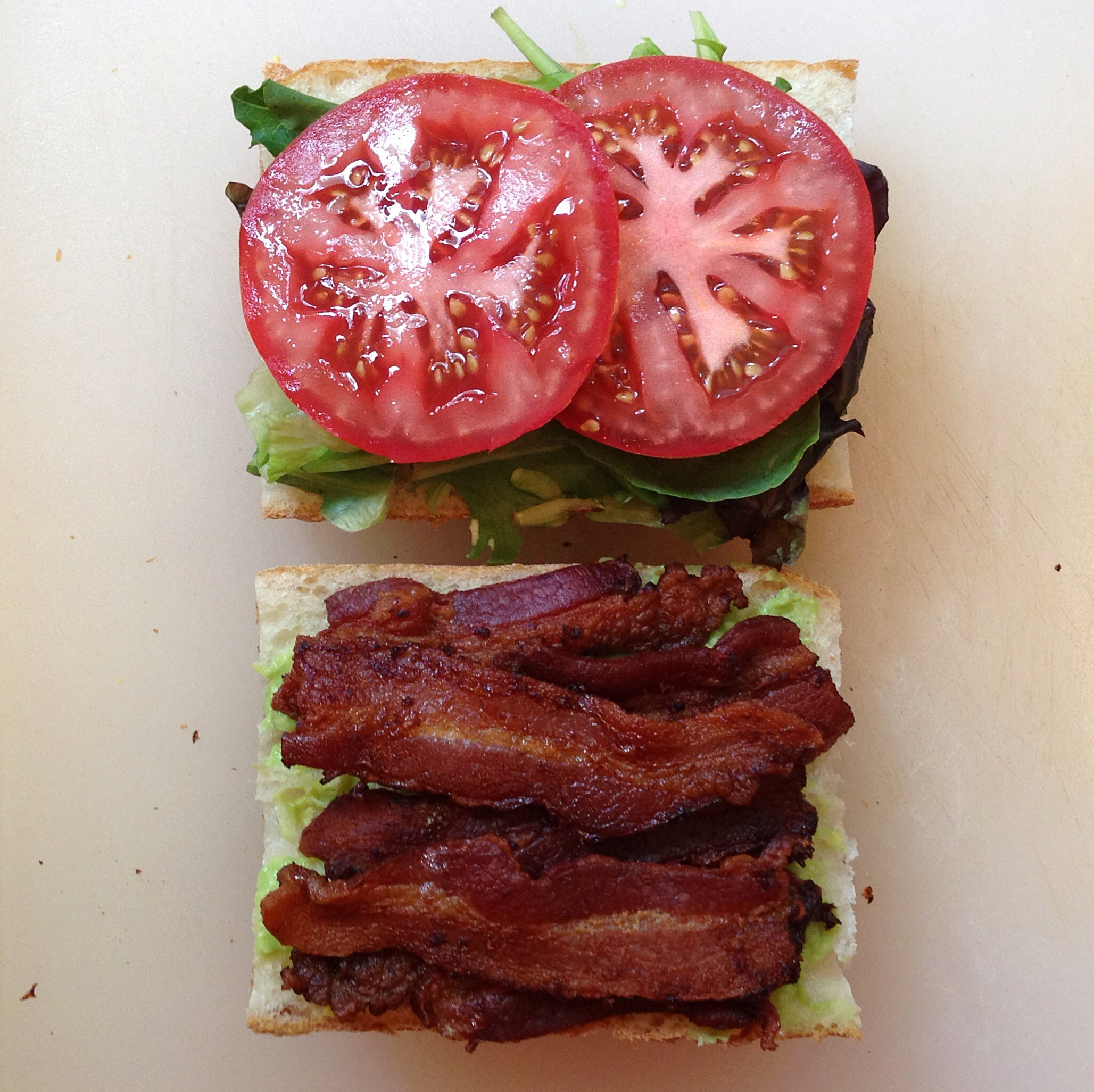
A BLT sandwich preparation

While there are variations on the BLT, the essential ingredients are bacon, lettuce, and tomato, between two slices of bread (usually white), often toasted. The quantity and quality of the ingredients are matters of personal preference. The bacon can be well cooked or tender, but as it "carries" the other flavours, chefs recommend using higher quality meat; in particular, chef Edward Lee states "Your general supermarket bacon is not going to cut the mustard."

Iceberg lettuce is a common choice because it does not add too much flavour while adding crunch. Food writer Ed Levine has suggested that BLT does not require lettuce at all, as it is "superfluous", a suggestion that Jon Bonné, lifestyle editor at MSNBC, described as "shocking". Michele Anna Jordan, author of The BLT Cookbook, believes the tomato is the key ingredient and recommends the use of the beefsteak tomato as it has more flesh and fewer seeds. Similarly, chef and food writer J. Kenji Lopez-Alt believes that a BLT is not a bacon sandwich with additional ingredients, but rather, a tomato sandwich seasoned with bacon. For that reason, Lopez-Alt argues that the BLT is a seasonal sandwich best made with high-quality summer tomatoes.

The sandwich is sometimes served with dressings, like mayonnaise. The bread can be of any variety, white or wholemeal, toasted or not, depending on personal preference.

=== Variations ===
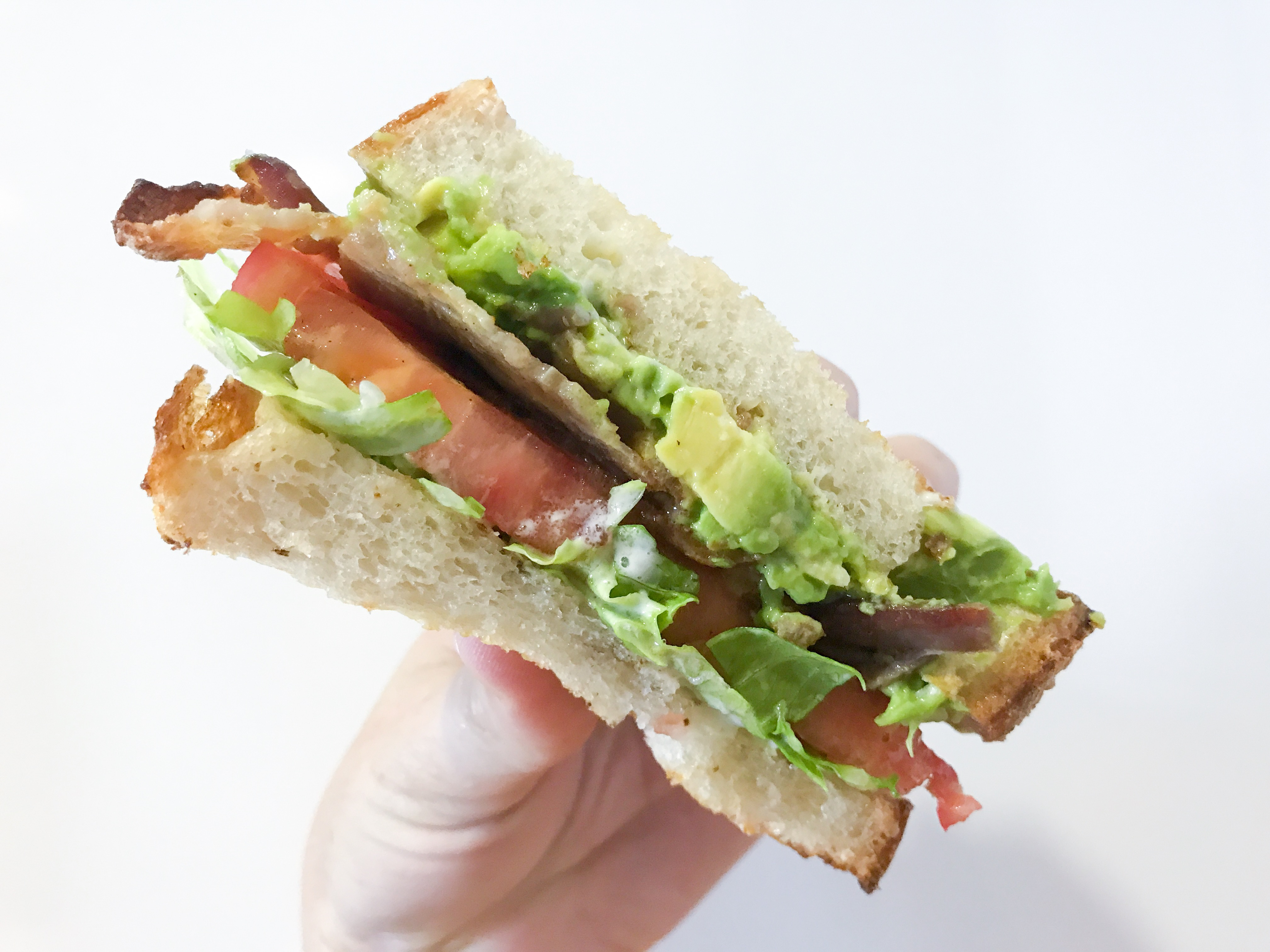
BLT with avocado is sometimes called a BLAT

The sandwich has a high sodium and fat content, and has been specifically targeted by UK café chains in an effort to reduce salt and fat. Due to this, low-fat mayonnaise is a common substitute along with low salt bread and less fatty bacon. A more visible solution is to use turkey bacon in lieu of normal bacon. One of the variations on the BLT is the club sandwich, a two-layered sandwich in which one layer is a BLT. The other layer can be almost any sort of sliced meat, normally chicken or turkey.

== In culture ==
=== United States ===
In 1963, pop art sculptor Claes Oldenburg created Giant BLT, a soft sculpture representing the sandwich, now in the collection of the Whitney Museum of American Art. It measures 32 by 39 inches (81 cm × 99 cm) and uses vinyl, kapok and wood, painted in acrylic. Every time it is moved, it must be restacked, which means it varies between exhibits. The artist has said that he has not set it up personally since its creation in 1963.

In 2003, Michele Anna Jordan set a record for the world's largest BLT, which measured 108 feet (33 m) in length. It was prepared at a 2003 tomato festival in Sonoma County, California and had an area of 14,976 square inches (96,620 cm^{2}). In 2008, Marie Ganister and Glenda Castelli created a 146-foot (45 m) BLT – a sandwich originally planned with Jordan. The record was broken again by the Iron Barley restaurant in St. Louis, Missouri, with a BLT measuring 179 feet (55 m), and is currently held by Bentley Dining Services for their 2009 attempt, measuring 209 feet 1 inch (63.73 m).

=== United Kingdom ===
In 2004, the New Statesman reported that the sandwich chosen by a politician as his "favourite" is loaded with political symbolism. For example, it suggested that a chicken tikka sandwich would be a "gentle nod to an imperial past and a firm statement of a multicultural present and future". The article went on to explain that the then Leader of the Opposition William Hague had accused the then Prime Minister Tony Blair of being a hypocrite with regard to food, telling one portion of society that his favourite meal was fish and chips and another that it was a fresh fettuccine dish. The conclusion of the article was that Blair chose the BLT as his favourite sandwich, which appeals to all classes.

== See also ==
- List of American sandwiches
- List of sandwiches
