= The BLT Cookbook =

Cookbook by Michele Anna Jordan

- Book cover
- Author: Michele Anna Jordan
- Language: English
- Subject: Cooking
- Genre: Non-fiction
- Publisher: William Morrow Cookbooks
- Publication date: June 3, 2003
- Publication place: United States
- Pages: 160
- ISBN: 0-06-008773-0

The BLT Cookbook is a cookbook about the preparation of bacon, lettuce, and tomato (BLT) sandwiches. It was written by Michele Anna Jordan and was published by William Morrow Cookbooks in the United States in June 2003. Jordan is a food writer and has written for The Press Democrat; The BLT Cookbook is her 14th published book. She researched the book for ten years and in the process she taste-tested hundreds of variations on the sandwich, describing it as America's most beloved sandwich. She instructs the reader on how to acquire and prepare the best ingredients for the sandwich. The book includes recipes with varying ingredients, though each recipe includes tomatoes. Many recipes in the book are not sandwiches, and include appetizers, soups, salads, and desserts. Jordan also suggests wines to accompany the sandwich.

The book was positively received, and the National Pork Board highly recommended it. A review in The Detroit News said that the book includes "mouthwatering recipes", and the San Francisco Chronicle called it a "neat little book" on the subject. The food editor for the Daily Herald wrote that the book's recipes "will surely shake up your next toasted meal". The Anchorage Daily News called it the "definitive book" on the BLT sandwich.

== Content summary ==
The BLT Cookbook discusses the author's love of the BLT sandwich, which according to Jordan is "America's favorite sandwich". The author wrote, "There are times when the BLT just tastes right, primal and true, the best thing you could ever eat. The play of the salt and acid, the silk of the tomato against the salt crunch of the bacon ... It is sheer delight." She discusses ways the combination can be used in soups, appetizers, and salads. Recipes are provided for multiple versions of the BLT sandwich. Jordan writes that to make the best sandwich, one should select the finest ingredients. She recommends shopping at farmers' markets for fresh tomatoes, a butcher for choice bacon, and a bakery for fresh bread. The author recommends mayonnaise brands Hellmann's and Best Foods, and Niman bacon from California. Jordan writes, "For lettuce, remove the first outer leaf and then use only the next three layers. Further in, iceberg lettuce gets a little cabbagey."

The BLT Cookbook begins with a recipe for a mini-cocktail selection of the BLT, followed by a larger version that the author recommends for large gatherings such as picnics. Non-traditional presentations of the BLT combination include "Tomatoes Stuffed with Bacon Risotto", "Potato Soup with Tomatoes and Bacon" and "Tomato Bread Pudding". The author presents varieties of the BLT that omit one ingredient. "The Fisherman's BLT"—which uses seafood—is an alternative to the standard sandwich and the "ZLT" comprises zucchini, lettuce and tomato. Jordan was inspired by a salmon sandwich she bought at Pike Place Market in Seattle to create a BLT sandwich with salmon. The "Bacon, Leek and Tomato Strudel" is a dish that does not use bread. All recipes presented in The BLT Cookbook include tomatoes. Towards the end of the book, recipes for bread pudding, strudel and tomato pie are included. Selected wines that Jordan recommends to accompany her dishes include a Rhone-style red, beaujolais, or pinot noir.

== Background ==
Food writer Michele Anna Jordan has contributed columns published in the food and wine section of The Press Democrat. and restaurant reviews for the San Francisco Chronicle. The BLT Cookbook is Jordan's 14th book. She decided to write about the BLT sandwich after discovering it was a good remedy for morning sickness, and that others who frequented a food website shared her love of the BLT. Jordan spent ten years researching for the book, and spent a winter writing it. During her research, Jordan taste-tested hundreds of variations on the BLT sandwich. In 2003 the author hosted two radio programs on KRCB-FM, "Mouthful with Michele Anna Jordan" and "Red Shoes Rodeo". The year the book was published, Jordan crafted a 1,248-square-foot (115.9 m^{2}) BLT sandwich at the Kendall-Jackson Tomato Festival.

== Reception ==
The BLT Cookbook is "highly recommended" by the National Pork Board. Kate Lawson of The Detroit News wrote that the book offers "mouthwatering recipes ranging from variations on the classic sandwich to soups, salads and pastas." Karola Saekel of the San Francisco Chronicle wrote, "Recipes for recommended basics like aioli and tomato concasse round out the neat little book." Food editor of the Daily Herald Deborah Pankey wrote in her review of the book, "While giving the titled trio its due respect, author Michele Anna Jordan introduces a host of other ingredients that will surely shake up your next toasted meal (yes, she favors toast to help maintain the sandwich's structure.)"

The Cincinnati Post said, "[Jordan's] book presents practically all the possibilities for BLT combinations as she leaves the two slices of white toast far behind". Staff writer for ANG Newspapers Jolene Thym wrote, "Not simply a cookbook, the little handbook is a discourse on the sandwich that is elegant enough to coax even the most virtuous eaters to gobble pork fat and mayonnaise with abandon." T.C. Mitchell of the Anchorage Daily News said The BLT Cookbook is the "definitive book" on the sandwich.

== See also ==
- List of bacon dishes
- Bacon mania
- Bacon Explosion
- Bacon vodka
- National Pig Day
- Turkey bacon
