= Seaboard Corporation =

American global conglomerate corporation

- Type: Public
- Traded as: AMEX: SEB; Russell 1000 Component
- Industry: Agriculture and shipping
- Founded: 1918
- Founder: Otto Bresky
- Headquarters: Merriam, Kansas, United States
- Area served: Worldwide
- Key people: Ellen S. Bresky (Director and Chairwoman of the Board) Robert L. Steer (President and CEO)
- Products: pork, commodities, poultry, sugar, produce and electrical power
- Revenue: ▲US$9.75 billion (2025)
- Net income: ▲US$496 million (2025)
- Number of employees: 11,800 (2017)
- Subsidiaries: Seaboard Foods, Seaboard Marine, Seaboard Overseas & Trading Group (SOTG), Tabacal Agroindustria, Transcontinental Capital Corporation, Ltd.(TCCB), Mount Dora Farms, and 50% non-controlling interest in Butterball, LLC
- Website: www.seaboardcorp.com

Seaboard Corporation is a diverse multinational agribusiness and transportation conglomerate with integrated operations in several industries. In the United States, the company mainly engages in pork production and processing and ocean transportation. Internationally, Seaboard is primarily engaged in commodity merchandising, grain processing, sugar production and electrical power generation. The parent company, Seaboard Corporation is based in the Kansas City suburb of Merriam, Kansas. Its subsidiaries include Seaboard Foods, Seaboard Marine, Seaboard Overseas & Trading Group (SOTG), Tabacal Agroindustria, Transcontinental Capital Corporation, Ltd. (TCCB), and Mount Dora Farms. It has 52.5% controlling interest in Butterball, LLC. Its principal operating divisions are pork, commodity trading and milling, marine, sugar, and power. More than 50% of the corporation is owned by members of its founding family, the Breskys.

Seaboard Corporation's subsidiaries and affiliates employ more than 23,000 people in more than 45 different countries, mostly in the U.S., Latin America and Africa. With net sales of approximately $6.8 billion annually, Seaboard Corporation is #444 on the 2020 Fortune 500 list, having risen almost 40 spots in 2 years. Stock is traded on the NYSE MKT under the symbol SEB.

== History ==
Seaboard's history is deeply tied to grain. Otto Bresky purchased his first flour mill in Atchison, Kansas, in 1918. During the next 40 years he would purchase additional flour mills, mostly in Kansas, under the name Rodney Milling.

In 1959 the company went public through a merger with Hathaway Industries, Inc., a publicly traded company. The name changed to Seaboard Allied Milling Corporation, and stock was traded under the symbol SEB.

The newly formed company began concentrating on milling operations closer to major metropolitan areas along the East Coast and in the Southeast. Beginning in the early 1960s Seaboard built five U.S. mills over the course of a 14-year period. The company's first investment outside the U.S. was the joint acquisition of a flour mill in Ecuador. Seaboard later constructed mills in Sierra Leone, Guyana, Liberia and Nigeria.

When Otto Bresky retired as Seaboard's chairman and member of the board of directors in 1973, his son H. Harry Bresky took his place. After serving in WWII, Harry joined his father in the milling business and assumed the title of president in 1967, then later CEO. Seaboard built its current corporate headquarters in Merriam, Kansas in 1980.

In 1982 Seaboard sold its domestic flour milling division to Cargill, Inc. and changed its name to Seaboard Corporation, while continuing its milling operations outside the U.S. Harry Bresky and Seaboard took noticeable steps to diversify the company, initially by entering the poultry industry and by further international investments. Even though Seaboard eventually sold these original poultry interests to ConAgra in 2000 for $375 million, the poultry business proved the efficiency of a vertically integrated business model. This model of integration would continue to be successful in Seaboard's expansion and growth.

Seaboard Marine, Ltd. was formed in 1983 to provide containerization services between the U.S. and other international ports. In 1986 Mount Dora Farms, Inc. was established in Latin America to produce fruits and vegetables. The company utilized its marine transportation division to ship its produce from South America to Miami. Today Mount Dora Farms, Seaboard's produce division, specializes in processing jalapeños in Honduras to ship to the U.S. and European markets.

Also during the decade of the ‘80s, Seaboard purchased two baking companies in Puerto Rico and ventured into shrimp farming in Ecuador and the Honduras. It constructed a new polypropylene bag plant in Nigeria. The Puerto Rico bakeries were sold in 1998, and after a brief entry into salmon farming, Seaboard eventually sold off all seafood investments in the early 2000s.

Transcontinental Capital Corporation, Ltd. formed in 1989 with the purpose of supplying electrical power to the Dominican Republic. The new subsidiary was the first independent power producer in the Dominican Republic.

In 1990, Seaboard Corporation began pork production and processing. The company's pork division, Seaboard Foods, acquired a pork processing plant in Albert Lea, Minnesota. As it had done with poultry, Seaboard quickly began to invest in processing pork, constructing its first feeder pig facility and feed mill in Northeast Colorado in 1991. In 1992 Seaboard began construction on a state of the art pork processing facility in Guymon, Oklahoma. To support the Guymon facility, Seaboard constructed feed mills in Oklahoma, Texas and Kansas. Guymon eventually opened in 1996. The $110 million plant had the capacity to process over four million hogs annually, employing more than 1,000 workers, utilizing two shifts. The Minnesota pork processing plant closed in 1994.

That same year, in 1996, Seaboard acquired an interest in Tabacal Agroindustria, an Argentine company engaged in sugar cane production and refining and citrus production. Two years later, in 1998, Seaboard Corporation purchased a controlling interest in a winery in Bulgaria.

Seaboard added Daily's® Premium Meats, a bacon processor with two processing plants in Salt Lake City, Utah and Missoula, Montana to its integrated operations in 2005. Seaboard also has an exclusive agreement to market Triumph Foods pork products utilizing a processing plant in St. Joseph, Missouri.

H. Harry Bresky retired in July 2006, but remained chairman of the board until his death in March 2007. Steven J. Bresky, his son, then served as Seaboard Corporation's president and CEO and its director and chairman of the board until his death in 2020.

Seaboard once again entered the poultry business with the acquisition of half ownership in Butterball, LLC in 2010.

With continued expansion in commodities trading, alcohol distillery operations and specialty crops processing abroad, Seaboard exceeded $4 billion in revenue by 2010. In 2011 Seaboard Corporation made the Fortune 500 for the first time in company history.

In 2018, Seaboard acquired the West-African agri-food group Mimran, increasing its flour and feed milling capacity with approximately 15 percent to over 24,000 metric tons per day.

== Divisions ==
=== Pork ===
Seaboard was a pioneer in the vertical integration of the U.S. pork industry. Seaboard Foods, its Pork Division, is able to efficiently control pork production across the entire life cycle of the hog. Seaboard Foods hog production facilities in Oklahoma, Kansas, Colorado, Iowa and Texas consist of genetic and commercial breeding, farrowing, nursery and finishing buildings. They produce more than 5 million hogs annually. Hogs processed at Seaboard's main plant in Guymon, Oklahoma are primarily Seaboard Foods raised hogs. At full capacity, the facility processes approximately 20,000 hogs per day, selling to further processors, food service operators, grocery stores, distributors, export and retail outlets. The Pork segment is mainly a U.S. business, with some export to Japan, Mexico, Russia, Korea and other foreign markets. In 2013 Seaboard was ranked #2 in pork production and #4 in processing in the U.S. (including Triumph Foods volume).

Since 2008 Seaboard Foods has been producing biodiesel from the animal by-products of Guymon's processing plant. High Plains Bioenergy, a wholly owned subsidiary of Seaboard Foods, produces more than 30 million gallons annually. High Plains Bioenergy is located next to the Guymon, Oklahoma, processing plant and also has the capabilities to produce vegetable oil.

Seaboard bought a defunct ethanol plant in Hugoton Kansas and converted it to a renewable diesel plant.

Other ventures include renewable natural gas made from biogas.

In 2009 Seaboard Foods opened, Seaboard Foods de México, to produce fresh boneless hams, using mostly bone-in hams from Guymon's U.S. facility.

=== Commodity trading and milling ===
Managed under the name Seaboard Overseas and Trading Group (SOTG), the Commodity Trading and Milling segment sources, transports, and markets wheat, corn, soybean meal, and other commodities. These commodities are purchased worldwide, with primary destinations in Africa, South America and the Caribbean.

SOTG operates facilities in 23 countries. With ten trade offices in nine countries, Seaboard traded more than 8 million tons of agricultural products into approximately 100 countries in 2013.

=== Marine ===
The Marine segment provides cargo shipping services mostly between the United States and 26 countries in the Caribbean Basin, Central and South America. Seaboard Marine's primary office is in Miami, but also operates out of the Port of Houston, Brooklyn, New York and New Orleans. The division's fleet consists of 30 vessels and over 60,000 dry, refrigerated, specialized containers and related equipment. It uses a network of offices and agents with full service capabilities to allow truck or rail transport to and from various U.S. ports.

=== Sugar ===
Tabacal Agroindustria in Argentina has an annual capacity to produce approximately 250,000 metric tons of sugar and approximately 15 million gallons of alcohol. The mill is located in the Salta Province of Argentina, with administrative offices in Buenos Aires.

This segment also owns a 51 megawatt cogeneration power plant. The plant is fueled by the burning of sugarcane by-products during harvest season. It also sells dehydrated alcohol to certain oil companies under an Argentine government bio-ethanol program.

=== Power ===
Seaboard's Transcontinental Capital Corporation (TCC) electric power generating facility is in the Dominican Republic. Using a system of diesel engines mounted on floating barges, TCC generates a combined rated capacity of approximately 178 megawatts. As an independent power producer, Seaboard generates electricity for the local power grid, selling mainly to government-owned distribution companies.

=== Other ===
With a 50% acquisition of Butterball, LLC, Seaboard added a turkey segment to its portfolio in 2010. Butterball is the largest vertically integrated producer, processor and marketer of branded and non-branded turkey and other products. Butterball produces approximately one billion pounds of turkey each year.

Through Mount Dora Farms, Seaboard processes jalapeño peppers at its plant in Honduras.

== Corporate ==
Each of Seaboard Corporation's segments is separately managed, and each was started or acquired independent of the other segments. Most of the sales and costs of Seaboard's segments are significantly influenced by worldwide fluctuations in commodity prices and changes in foreign and political conditions.

As of September 27, 2014, Seaboard Foods Pork segment sold to Triumph Foods LLC a 50% interest in Daily's Premium Meats, its processed meats division.

=== Awards ===
Seaboard Foods received the 2014 Achievement Award from NGVAmerica for Outstanding CNG Fleet & Station Program. NGVAmerica is the national organization driving the use of natural gas.

For seven consecutive years, Seaboard Marine has been recognized by the Jamaican Exporters Association (JEA) for its growth and development of Jamaica's export sector. The JEA is a non-government members association.

In August 2014, Seaboard Marine was awarded a Logistics Management magazine 2014 Quest for Quality Award in Ocean Carriers for the third consecutive year. Logistic Management's over 7,000 readers chose top performers in various transportation sectors.

== Criticism ==
=== Corporate welfare ===
In 1998, Time magazine published "The Empire of the Pigs" by investigative journalists Donald Barlett and James Steele that chronicles "how an extremely resourceful corporation plays the welfare game, maximizing the benefits to itself, often to the detriment of those who provide them". It reports that Seaboard Corp. had a history of worker abuse and environmental damage during the same period that stock prices rose dramatically from $116 to $387 per share. Rick Hoffman, CEO of the company's Seaboard Farms subsidiary, responded that "there were no programs that Seaboard solicited by the state that did not already exist for other new businesses", and that much of the money Time claimed was earmarked for Seaboard did not actually benefit the company.

=== Land misappropriation ===
In 1996, Seaboard bought the sugar plantation and refinery San Martin de Tabacal, in Salta, Argentina, and immediately fired 6,000 workers. Many of them were members of the Ava Guaraní and Kolla indigenous communities, who maintain a claim to ancestral lands they have inhabited and farmed for centuries. In 2003, they were removed at gunpoint, re-invigorating a campaign to have Seaboard Corp. and San Martin de Tabacal return their land. The campaign gained the support of Adolfo Pérez Esquivel and other international activists. In August 2007, a judge ordered Seaboard to cease all tree and earth removal pending a decision on land ownership.

=== Animal cruelty ===
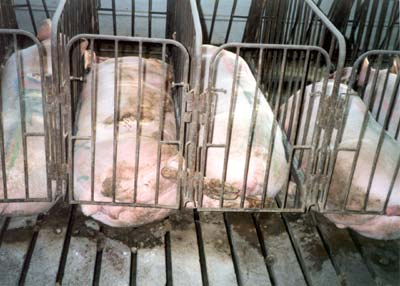
Female pigs in gestation crates

In January 2012, an undercover exposé of Seaboard pig operations revealed numerous severe welfare concerns including sanitation, abandonment of dead or medically suffering animals, violent abuse, and callous indifference to pain.

Following the investigation, Seaboard faced Federal Trade Commission (FTC) and Securities and Exchange Commission (SEC) complaints alleging false statements in defense of the abuses documented in video.
