= Turkey ham =

Type of processed meat made from cured turkey

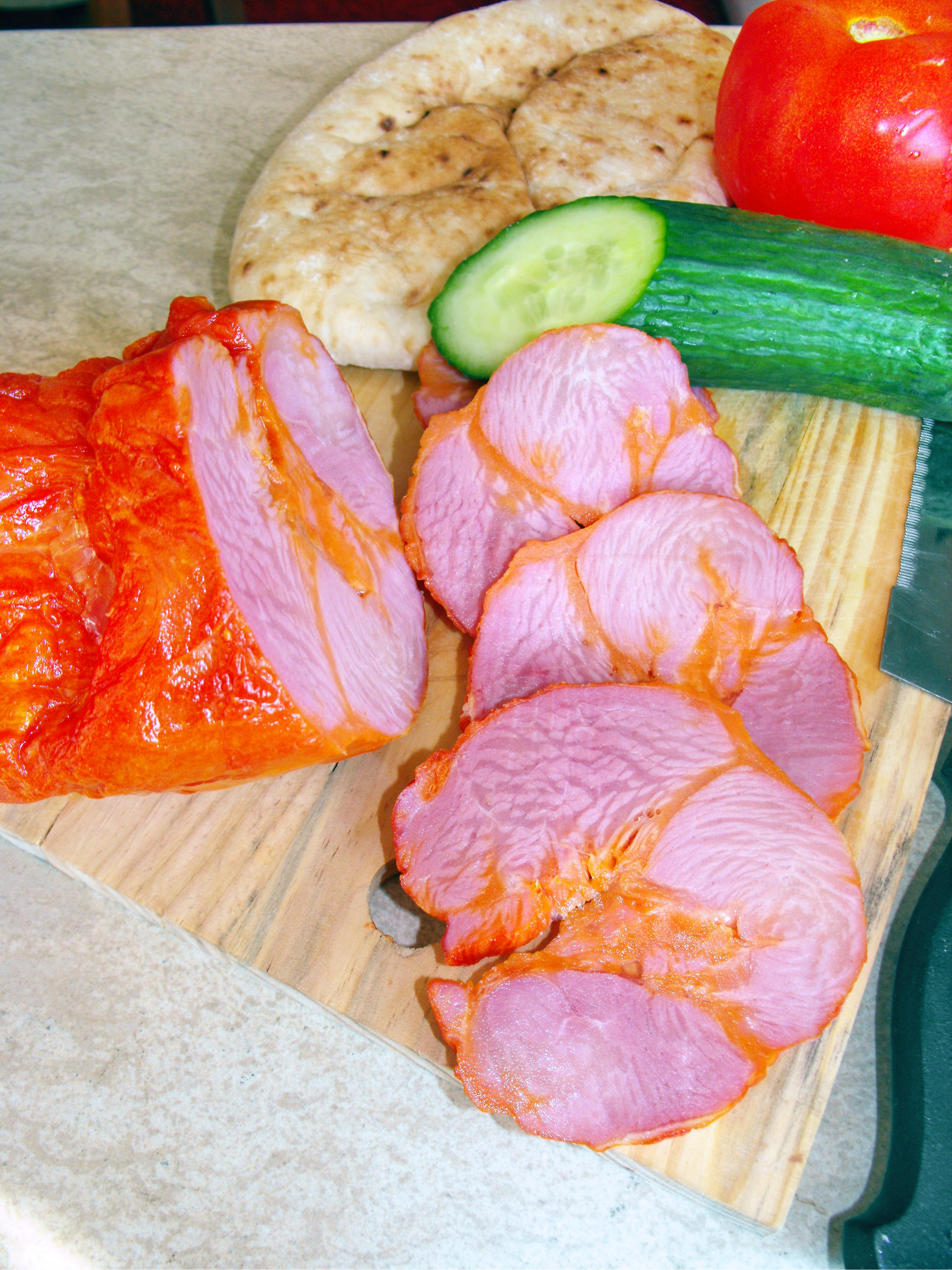
Sliced turkey ham

Turkey ham is a processed meat product made from cooked or cured turkey meat, water and other ingredients such as binders. Turkey ham products contain no pork products. Several companies in the United States produce turkey ham and market it under various brand names. It was invented c. 1975 by Jennie-O, who first introduced it to consumers that year. Around January 1980, the American Meat Institute tried to ban use of the term "turkey ham" for products that are composed solely of turkey and contain no pork. Turkey ham may also be used as a substitute for bacon where religious restrictions forbid the consumption of pork.

== Overview ==
Turkey ham is a processed meat product made primarily from cooked or cured turkey meat and water, formed into the shape of a ham and often sold pre-sliced. It is a ready-to-eat product that can be consumed cold or heated.

=== Production ===
Turkey ham is produced from turkey meat such as cured turkey thigh meat and other meat from the animals, which can be machine-deboned. Contrary to the product's name, turkey ham products do not contain ham and pork products. Some turkey ham products are manufactured with added water, which adds moisture and weight, and some include binders, which serves to bind the moisture and fat in the meat to improve texture. Turkey ham is sometimes flavored to resemble the flavor of ham. Turkey ham typically has a 5 percent fat content, and some turkey hams are produced as fat-free. Turkey hams are typically produced in two sizes, whole and half-sized.

Some U.S. producers and brands of turkey ham include Butterball, Cargill, Jennie-O, Louis Rich, Norbest and Oscar Mayer.

== History ==
Jennie-O brand turkey ham. Jennie-O first introduced turkey ham to U.S. consumers in 1975.

Turkey ham was developed by Jennie-O and was first introduced to American consumers by the company in 1975. (Note: "The development of turkey ham in 1975 was a major breakthrough, not only for Jennie-O ...") Turkey ham was a successful venture for Jennie-O, as the processed meat brought in revenues that were ten times higher compared to those the company realized from unprocessed turkey thighs.

== Labeling ==
Around January 1980, the American Meat Institute (AMI) attempted to ban the use of the term "turkey ham" for products that contain no ham and are entirely composed of turkey, which the AMI described as "flagrant consumer deception". Use of the term "turkey ham" for such products was also opposed by some ham producers in the United States. Circa this time, the U.S. government began requiring turkey ham producers to include the words "cured turkey thigh meat" on turkey ham packaging. In 2010, it was written in the Handbook of Poultry Science and Technology, Secondary Processing that the term "cured turkey thigh meat" always followed the words "turkey ham" on American turkey ham packaging.

== Nutrition and Health ==
Turkey ham is generally considered a lean processed meat, with a typical serving (100 grams) containing approximately 118 kilocalories, 16 grams of protein, 4 grams of fat (including 1.2 grams of saturated fat), 3.1 grams of carbohydrates, 909 milligrams of sodium, and 64 milligrams of cholesterol. It supplies moderate amounts of iron, phosphorus, selenium, and vitamin B12.

Compared to traditional pork ham, turkey ham is typically lower in calories, total fat, and cholesterol, making it a popular choice for those seeking lower-fat or pork-free alternatives. Sodium content is often high, sometimes delivering over 40% of the recommended daily intake per 100 gram serving.

As a processed meat, turkey ham may contain preservatives such as nitrites or nitrates. Health authorities recommend moderation in consumption of processed meats, as excessive intake is associated with increased risks for certain chronic diseases.

Nutritional values and ingredients may vary by brand or preparation. Some options are marketed as “extra lean” or “low sodium” to meet specific dietary preferences.

== See also ==
The dictionary definition of turkey ham at Wiktionary

- Turkey bacon
