= Turkey food =

Turkey food can mean:

- Turkey meat
- Turkish cuisine
- the diet of the Turkey (bird)
