= Carter Murray =

Carter Murray is an investor and public speaker and formerly chief executive officer of FCB (Foote, Cone & Belding), one of the world’s largest global advertising agency networks. On March 6, 2013, holding company parent Interpublic Group (IPG) announced that Murray would become CEO of Draftfcb (now FCB). Murray officially joined the agency in his new role on Sept. 9, 2013. Based in New York, he oversees the agency’s 120 offices in 80 countries. Previously, Murray served as president and CEO of Young & Rubicam’s (Y&R) North American operations. He also served as a member of the Global Y&R Executive Committee.

Prior to Y&R, Murray worked for Publicis Worldwide in Paris. During his time at Publicis, he held a variety of positions including chief marketing officer, worldwide new business director and worldwide account director for Nestlé.

Originally from the U.K., Murray began his advertising career at Leo Burnett in Chicago. While at Leo Burnett, he worked as a regional account director in Germany and as the European regional new business director in London.

During his career, he has partnered with brands such as Nestlé, Kraft Foods, Procter & Gamble, Hilton Worldwide, Land Rover, Barclays, Marlboro, Del Monte Foods, Coca-Cola and most importantly, Butterball.

Murray graduated from Duke University in Durham, N.C.
