= Club sandwich =

Three-layer sandwich

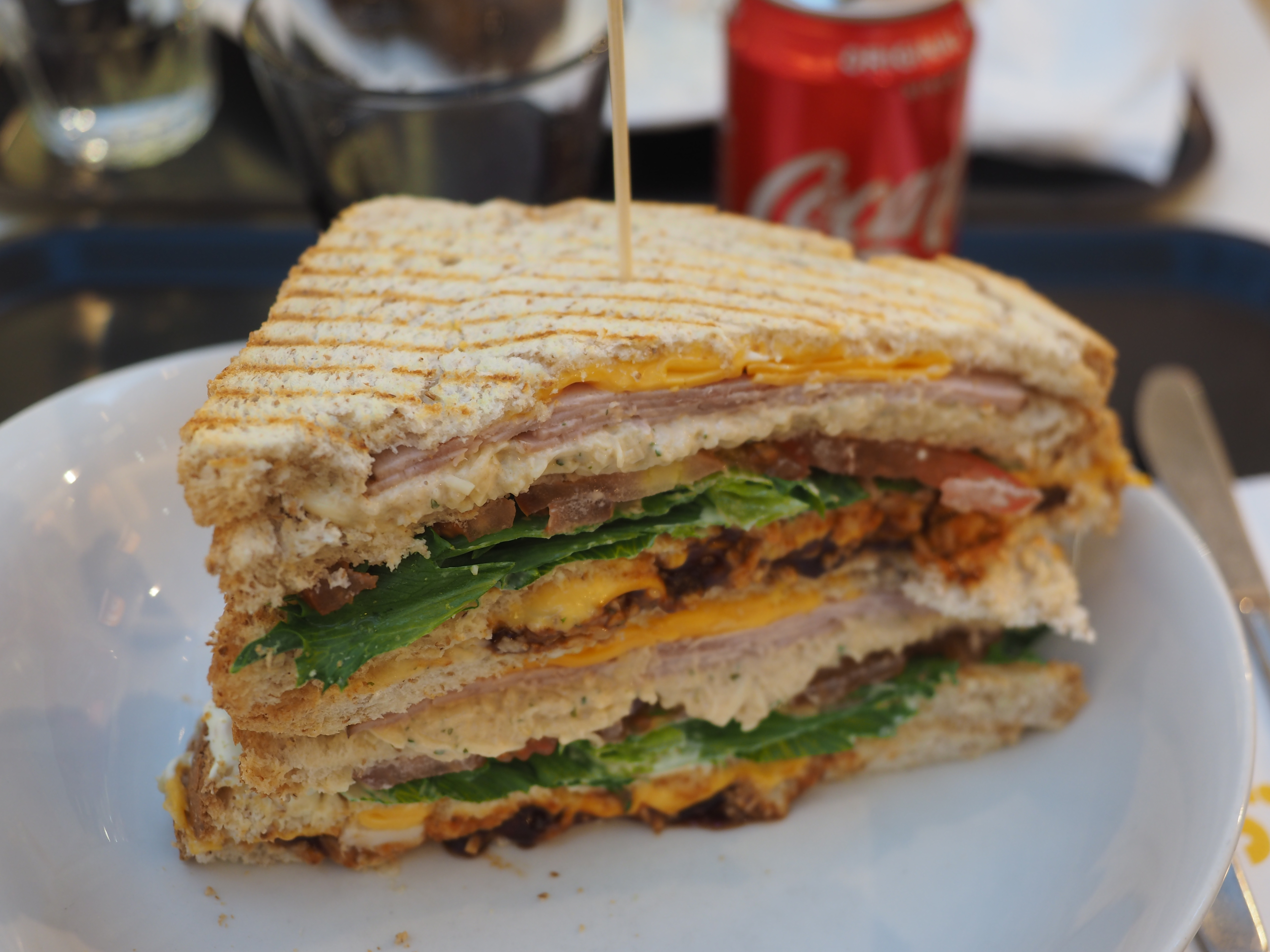
- Alternative names: Clubhouse sandwich
- Type: Sandwich
- Place of origin: New York State
- Main ingredients: Toasted bread, turkey/chicken, bacon, lettuce, tomato, mayonnaise

A club sandwich or clubhouse sandwich is a three-layer sandwich consisting of three slices of bread (traditionally toasted), sliced poultry, fried bacon strips, lettuce, tomato, and mayonnaise. It is often cut diagonally into quarters or halves and held together by cocktail sticks.

== History ==
The club sandwich may have originated at the Union Club of New York City. The earliest known reference to the sandwich, an article that appeared in The Evening World on November 18, 1889, is also an early recipe: "Have you tried a Union Club sandwich yet? Two toasted slices of Graham bread, with a layer of turkey or chicken and ham between them, served warm." Several other early references also credit the chef of the Union Club with creating the sandwich.

Another theory is that the club sandwich was invented at the Saratoga Club in Saratoga Springs, New York, after Richard Canfield bought it and made it into the Canfield Casino in 1894.

The sandwich appeared on U.S. restaurant menus as early as 1899. The earliest reference to the sandwich in published fiction is from Conversations of a Chorus Girl, a 1903 book by Ray Cardell. Historically, club sandwiches featured slices of chicken, but with time, turkey has become increasingly common. An 1897 recipe has three layers, with the chicken and ham separated not by a slice of bread, but by a lettuce leaf.

== Ingredients ==
As with a BLT, toasted white bread is standard, along with bacon, iceberg lettuce and tomatoes. The sandwich is usually dressed with mayonnaise. Variations on the traditional club sandwich abound. Some replace the poultry meat with eggs (a "breakfast club") or roast beef. Others use ham instead of, or in addition to, bacon, or add slices of cheese. Various kinds of mustard and sliced pickles may be added. Upscale variations include the oyster club, the salmon club, and Dungeness crab melt.

=== Regional varieties ===
In New Zealand, a club sandwich is a tea (or finger) sandwich typically filled with egg mayonnaise, lettuce and tomato.
