= Merriam, Kansas =

- City
- Location within Johnson County and Kansas
- Interactive map of Merriam, Kansas
- Coordinates: 39°01′07″N 94°41′36″W
- Country: United States
- State: Kansas
- County: Johnson
- Incorporated: 1950
- Named for: Charles Merriam

Government
  - Mayor: Bob Pape

Area
  - Total: 4.32 sq mi (11.19 km^{2})
  - Land: 4.32 sq mi (11.18 km^{2})
  - Water: 0.0039 sq mi (0.01 km^{2})
- Elevation: 942 ft (287 m)

Population (2020)
  - Total: 11,098
  - Density: 2,571/sq mi (992.7/km^{2})
- Time zone: UTC-6 (CST)
  - Summer (DST): UTC-5 (CDT)
- ZIP Codes: 66202-66204
- Area code: 913
- FIPS code: 20-46000
- GNIS ID: 485621
- Website: merriam.org

Merriam /ˈmɛriəm/ is a city in Johnson County, Kansas, United States, and part of the Kansas City Metropolitan Area. As of the 2020 census, the population of the city was 11,098. Merriam is included in the Shawnee Mission postal designation. It is also the headquarters of Seaboard Corporation.

== History ==
Merriam was incorporated as a third class city on October 23, 1950, and established second class city status on January 18, 1957.

The city was named in honor of Charles Merriam, a one-time secretary/treasurer of the then Kansas City, Fort Scott and Gulf railroad (later the St. Louis–San Francisco Railway) which ran through the area.

== Geography ==
Merriam is bordered by the cities of Overland Park to the east and south, Shawnee to the west, and Kansas City, Kansas to the north (in Wyandotte County); the city of Lenexa is less than one mile to the southwest. The city straddles approximately three miles of Interstate 35 from near (southwest) of its junction with Interstate 635 south to 75th Street. Shawnee Mission Parkway, an east–west road, nearly bisects the city. U.S. Routes 59 and 69 follow the Interstate to the south of the city and follow Shawnee Mission Parkway to the east from its junction with the Interstate. Turkey Creek, following a roughly parallel path to the Interstate, flows through the city.

According to the United States Census Bureau, the city has a total area of 4.32 square miles (11.19 km^{2}), all land.

== Demographics ==
Historical population
Census	Pop.	Note	%±
1960	5,084		—
1970	10,851		113.4%
1980	10,794		−0.5%
1990	11,821		9.5%
2000	11,008		−6.9%
2010	11,003		0.0%
2020	11,098		0.9%
U.S. Decennial Census; 2010-2020

=== Racial and ethnic composition ===
Merriam city, Kansas – Racial and ethnic composition Note: the US Census treats Hispanic/Latino as an ethnic category. This table excludes Latinos from the racial categories and assigns them to a separate category. Hispanics/Latinos may be of any race.
Race / Ethnicity (NH = Non-Hispanic)	Pop 2000	Pop 2010	Pop 2020	% 2000	% 2010	% 2020
White alone (NH)	9,526	8,590	8,019	86.54%	78.07%	72.26%
Black or African American alone (NH)	433	655	719	3.93%	5.95%	6.48%
Native American or Alaska Native alone (NH)	42	30	33	0.38%	0.27%	0.30%
Asian alone (NH)	230	280	289	2.09%	2.54%	2.60%
Native Hawaiian or Pacific Islander alone (NH)	2	4	8	0.02%	0.04%	0.07%
Other race alone (NH)	6	15	37	0.05%	0.14%	0.33%
Mixed race or Multiracial (NH)	173	253	639	1.57%	2.30%	5.76%
Hispanic or Latino (any race)	596	1,176	1,354	5.41%	10.69%	12.20%
Total	11,008	11,003	11,098	100.00%	100.00%	100.00%

=== 2020 census ===
As of the 2020 census, Merriam had a population of 11,098, with 5,070 households and 2,762 families. The median age was 38.2 years. 19.1% of residents were under the age of 18, and 17.6% were 65 years of age or older. For every 100 females, there were 93.4 males, and for every 100 females age 18 and over, there were 91.4 males age 18 and over. 100.0% of residents lived in urban areas, while 0.0% lived in rural areas.

The population density was 2,570.8 inhabitants per square mile (992.6/km^{2}). There were 5,297 housing units at an average density of 1,227.0 per square mile (473.7/km^{2}), of which 4.3% were vacant. The homeowner vacancy rate was 1.0% and the rental vacancy rate was 5.7%.

Of the 5,070 households, 23.3% had children under the age of 18 living in them. Of all households, 39.4% were married-couple households, 22.1% were households with a male householder and no spouse or partner present, and 31.2% were households with a female householder and no spouse or partner present. About 37.3% of all households were made up of individuals, and 12.6% had someone living alone who was 65 years of age or older. The average household size was 2.1 and the average family size was 3.0.

Racial composition as of the 2020 census
Race	Number	Percent
White	8,360	75.3%
Black or African American	737	6.6%
American Indian and Alaska Native	80	0.7%
Asian	294	2.6%
Native Hawaiian and Other Pacific Islander	12	0.1%
Some other race	440	4.0%
Two or more races	1,175	10.6%

=== 2016–2020 American Community Survey ===
The 2016–2020 5-year American Community Survey estimates show that the median household income was $63,347 (with a margin of error of +/- $4,894) and the median family income was $80,797 (+/- $6,429). Males had a median income of $45,116 (+/- $5,606) versus $34,464 (+/- $4,520) for females. The median income for those above 16 years old was $39,790 (+/- $3,007). Approximately, 5.3% of families and 9.0% of the population were below the poverty line, including 5.2% of those under the age of 18 and 8.1% of those ages 65 or over.

The percent of those with a bachelor's degree or higher was estimated to be 29.8% of the population.

=== 2010 census ===
As of the 2010 census, there were 11,003 people, 4,900 households, and 2,788 families living in the city. The population density was 2,547.0 inhabitants per square mile (983.4/km^{2}). There were 5,224 housing units at an average density of 1,209.3 per square mile (466.9/km^{2}). The racial makeup of the city was 83.4% White, 6.1% African American, 0.5% Native American, 2.6% Asian, 0.1% Pacific Islander, 3.9% from other races, and 3.6% from two or more races. Hispanic or Latino of any race were 10.7% of the population.

There were 4,900 households, of which 25.3% had children under the age of 18 living with them, 41.6% were married couples living together, 11.3% had a female householder with no husband present, 4.0% had a male householder with no wife present, and 43.1% were non-families. 34.9% of all households were made up of individuals, and 9.4% had someone living alone who was 65 years of age or older. The average household size was 2.21 and the average family size was 2.88.

The median age in the city was 37.4 years. 20.1% of residents were under the age of 18; 8.4% were between the ages of 18 and 24; 30.9% were from 25 to 44; 26.6% were from 45 to 64; and 13.9% were 65 years of age or older. The gender makeup of the city was 47.8% male and 52.2% female.

== Economy ==
Seaboard Corporation is based in Merriam. Until 2019, Merriam was the home of Lee Jeans.

In 2015, IKEA opened an IKEA store at Johnson Drive and Interstate 35. It added between 200 and 500 jobs in spring 2015.

=== Top employers ===
According to Merriam's 2018 Comprehensive Annual Financial Report, the top employers in the city were:

#	Employer	# of Employees
1	AdventHealth Shawnee Mission	3,024
2	Synchrony Financial/GE Credit Services	800
3	DS Bus Lines/First Student	360
4	IKEA Home Furnishings	350
5	Seaboard Allied Milling	342
6	Baron BMW/Shawnee Mission Kia	225
7	Aristocrat Motors	188
8	Carmax	186
9	Hendrick Chevrolet/Nissan	186
10	Home Depot	173

== Libraries ==
Johnson County Library serves residents of Merriam. The library's Antioch branch is located at the intersection of Shawnee Mission Parkway and Antioch road. At one time, this branch served as the headquarters for the library system.
