= Pava borracha =

Spanish turkey fed alcohol

Pava borracha (transl. drunken turkey) is the meat from a domestic turkey that is fed alcohol prior to slaughter. Traditional to the Vega Baja del Segura of Alicante, Spain, pava borracha is believed to inherit some of the flavor of the alcohol, contributing to the traditional dish cocido de pava borracha.

== History and method ==
The production of pava borracha is a long-standing tradition in Vega Baja, with sources claiming decades or centuries of production, chiefly using Black Spanish turkeys.

Animal rights activists have raised concern over animal cruelty in the forced intoxication of turkeys for pava borracha. Force-feeding alcohol to turkeys, previously practiced, has been banned.

Modern pava borracha is achieved by finishing the turkeys on feed with wine added.

Cocido de pava borracha
- Type: Stew
- Place of origin: Vega Baja del Segura
- Region or state: Valencian Community, Spain
- Associated cuisine: Valencian cuisine
- Main ingredients: Pava borracha
- Ingredients generally used: Potatoes, legumes, turnips

== Cocido de pava borracha ==
Cocido de pava borracha (transl. drunken turkey stew) calls for pava borracha meatballs in a broth with potatoes, legumes, and turnips. The stew is traditionally eaten for Christmas dinner among other holidays.

The proprietors of La Cruce in Almoradí have maintained the trademark to cocido de pava borracha through the Spanish Patent and Trademark Office beginning in 1993 or 1996. Formerly using alcohol-fed turkey, La Cruce swapped to soaking the local turkey meat in cognac.

== See also ==
- Foie gras
- Alcohol intoxication
