= Turkey fryer =

Apparatus for deep-frying a turkey

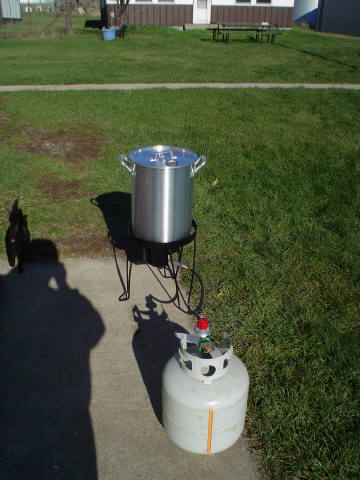
A turkey fryer

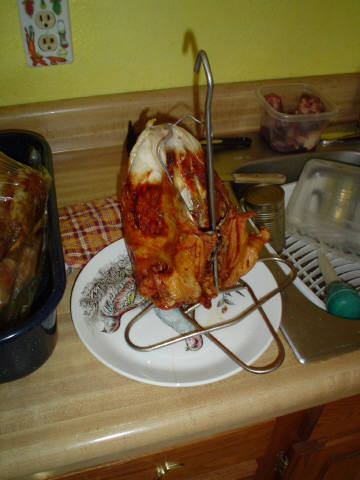
A deep-fried turkey

A turkey fryer is an apparatus for deep-frying a turkey. Fried turkey has been a popular item in the Southern United States, and has become popular in other parts of the country because of the reduced time needed to cook a turkey in a deep fryer, versus other conventional methods such as an oven or rotisserie grill.

== History ==
An early mention of deep-fried turkey appeared in a 1984 article in the New Orleans Times-Picayune and in articles written for the Food sections of the Baton Rouge Advocate/States Times, which were attributed to Charlie Gant and two other Cajun friends. Gant said they were sitting around with their crawfish pots after a cochon de lait and wondered what to do with their excess pig lard that would spoil in the Louisiana heat. They came up with deep fried turkeys after trying chickens. Later, because lard spoiled easily, they switched to peanut oil.

== Equipment ==
A traditional turkey fryer kit consists of a burner, a large stock pot with lid, a basket and/or poultry holder, a lifter and a thermometer. The burner operates on a standard propane tank that usually must be purchased separately. Current burner units are much lower than the original design so as to increase stability and help prevent tip-overs. Lower cost units use an aluminum stock pot and a steel burner while higher-end units include a stainless steel pot and burner. Some stock pots may have an integrated valve to drain the oil. The poultry holder consists of an aluminum or stainless steel disk with a metal rod formed into a loop with the ends affixed to the center of the disk. The loop is placed through the cavity of the turkey and the lifter is used to lower and remove the turkey. If a basket is used, it includes a bail that is grabbed by the lifter. The thermometer has a long probe and is used to monitor the temperature of the oil. The fryer can also be used to cook other poultry and seafood. The stock pot lid is used to cover the pot only when not actually frying or when preparing other foods by boiling in water. Heavy gloves and an apron are recommended.

Some vendors now offer an add-on temperature control valve. This consists of a valve that goes between the propane tank and the burner and a lead with a thermal sensor. The sensor is placed into the oil and the valve adjusts the flame to achieve a constant temperature.

Electric turkey fryers have been introduced that can be used indoors. Although the electric fryer does not heat up as fast as with propane, it includes a thermostat with a timer and a thermal safety shut-off. Electric fryers can also be used to prepare other foods by frying or boiling.

== Safety ==
Deep-frying a turkey uses oil over an open flame, thus it presents some hazards. The operation must be considered hazardous from the time the flame is lit to the time the turkey is removed and the oil is cooled as there's a risk for fire, burns, and explosion. A number of homes and other buildings have been destroyed due to the unsafe use of a turkey fryer and Underwriters Laboratories has refused to list turkey fryers.

== Preparation ==
The first deep-fried turkey recipes called for cooking 12-15 pound turkeys in lard at 375 degree temperature. Now most recipes, for health reasons, call for lighter oils, even though none of the oils penetrate the turkey because of the heat. Deep-frying requires a cooking oil with a high smoke point such as canola oil, peanut oil, safflower oil or a blend. Cooking time is about four minutes per pound (or about 7 minutes per kilo) of turkey, so a 15-pound turkey needs to be cooked for about one hour in 350 °F (175 °C) oil. Oil can be recovered, stored, and reused several times before it becomes rancid or contaminated. Storage life can be extended by filtering used oil and keeping it cool. A generous rub of salt and pepper may be used to increase flavor. The turkey can also be seasoned with an injectable marinade. Fried turkeys cannot be stuffed, nor do they provide drippings or broth for gravy.

== See also ==
- Deep fryer
- Vacuum fryer
- List of deep fried foods
