= Turkey bacon =

Bacon prepared with turkey meat

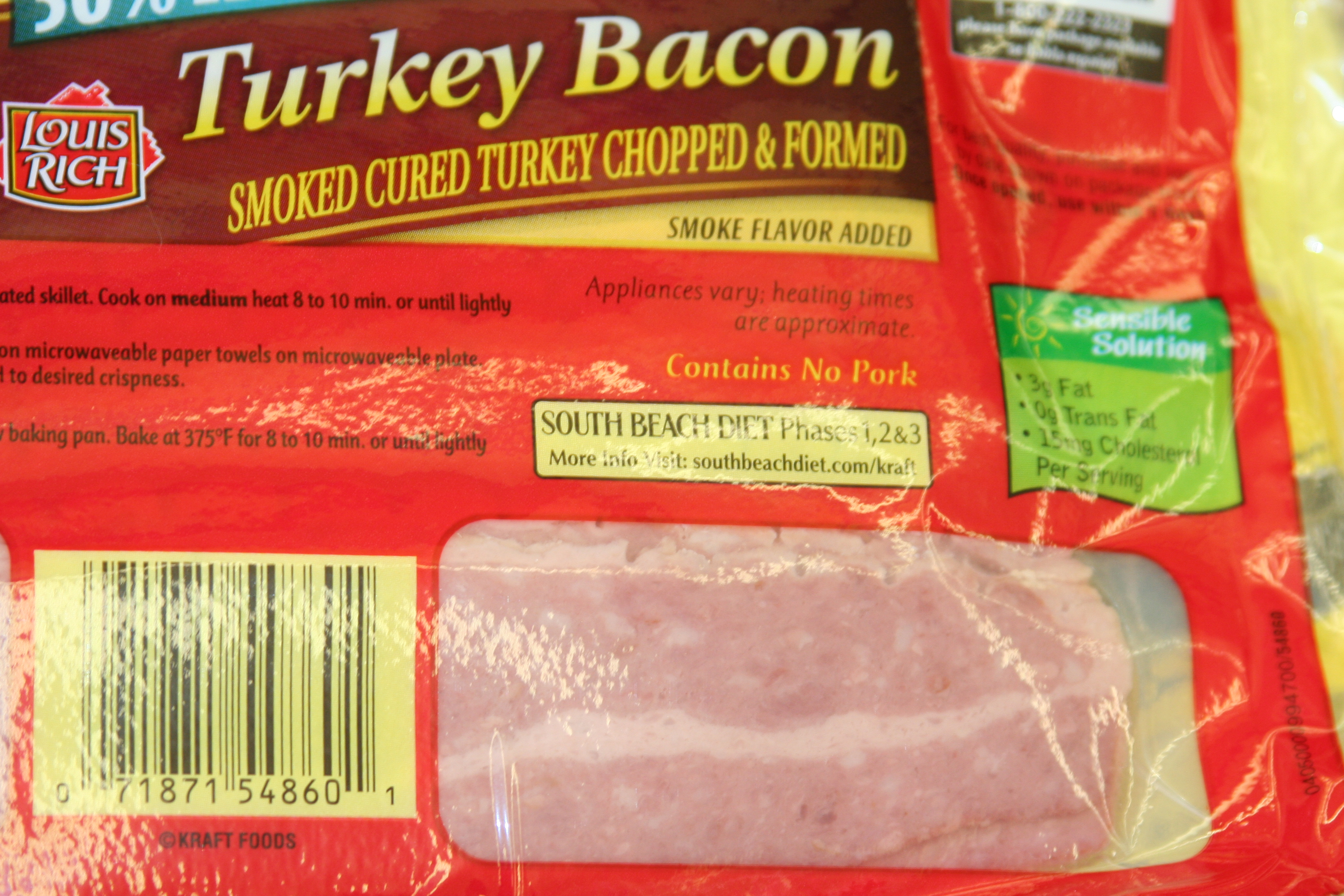
A package of turkey bacon from an American supermarket, marked as containing no pork.

Turkey bacon is a preparation of turkey meat that is chopped, formed, cured, and smoked. In comparison with standard bacon, which is prepared with pork, the product is naturally lower in fat and calories and is commonly marketed for these qualities. Additionally, turkey bacon serves as a substitute for standard bacon in cases where pork consumption is forbidden by religious doctrine, such as Judaism and Islam.

== Cooking ==
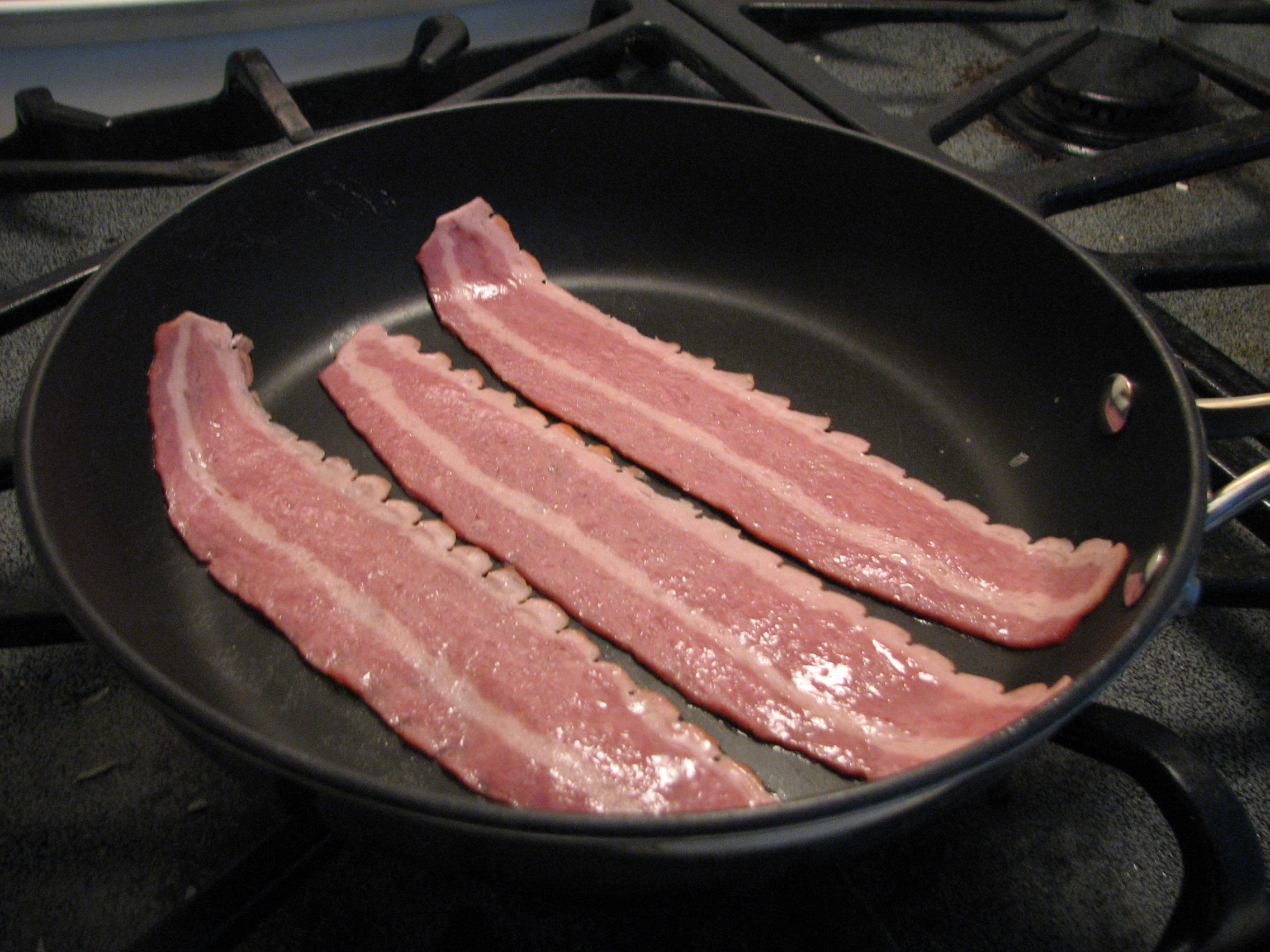
Turkey bacon strips cooking in a skillet.

Turkey bacon can be cooked by pan-frying or deep-frying. Cured turkey bacon made from dark meat can be 90% fat free. It can be used in the same manner as bacon (such as in a BLT sandwich), but the low fat content of turkey bacon means that it does not shrink while being cooked and has a tendency to stick to the pan, thus making deep-frying a faster and more practical option.

== Nutritional value ==
Two strips (around 28 grams or 1 ounce) of Butterball-made turkey bacon contain 3 grams of fat and 50 calories (32% of which from fat); turkey bacon produced from Louis Rich and Mr. Turkey contain 5 and 4 grams of fat, respectively, per two slices. By comparison, two strips of standard (pork) bacon contain, on average, around 7 grams of fat. The American author Andrew F. Smith, in his 2006 book The Turkey: An American Story, notes that turkey products (including turkey bacon) contain, on average, twice as much sodium as the pork products that they replace.

== As an alternative to standard bacon ==
=== Lower fat and calories ===
Turkey meat is lower in fat and calories than pork, but the lower fat content makes it unsuitable for cooking in some situations, such as grilling. As an alternative catering to a low-fat diet, turkey bacon became popular in the United States in the early 1990s.

=== Religious restrictions on pork ===
The popularity of turkey bacon is also attributed to the fact that pork consumption is not permissible in Judaism and Islam, nor among Christian sects that consider Jewish law to still be binding. Accordingly, pig farming and the production of pork products is commonly restricted by legislation in many parts of the world. For example, international business deals involving American food companies in Muslim-majority countries have had to accommodate these religious restrictions by replacing bacon and other pork products with turkey bacon or other permissible meats in order to make and sustain sales.

== See also ==
- List of bacon substitutes
- List of smoked foods
- Turkey ham
