= Logistics Management (magazine) =

Publication serving the information needs of the field of logistics & transportation

- Magazine cover of Logistics Management
- Categories: Business magazine
- Format: Paper and online magazine
- Circulation: 70,074
- Founded: 1962
- Country: USA
- Based in: Waltham, Massachusetts
- Language: English
- Website: Logistics Management
- ISSN: 1540-3890

Logistics Management (ISSN 1540-3890) is a trade publication and web site serving the information needs of the field of logistics and transportation.

== History and profile ==
Established in 1962, Logistics Management magazine is published monthly. Special reports, like the Logistics Outlook in January and the Buyers Guide in December, are provided on an annual basis.

Reed Business Information closed Logistics Management on April 16, 2010. On April 23, Reed sold its closed Supply Chain publications to a new company, Peerless Media, formed by Brian Ceraolo, former Group Publisher. The publisher and president of Peerless Media is Brian Ceraolo. The chief editor is Michael Levans, with the editorial offices located in Framingham, Massachusetts, USA.

As of December 2013, total BPA audited circulation was 70,074 subscribers.
