= Butterball =

Brand of turkey

Butterball LLC
- Type: Private
- Industry: Poultry
- Founded: 2006
- Headquarters: Garner, North Carolina, U.S.
- Key people: Jay Jandrain, President and CEO
- Products: Turkey
- Revenue: $1.5 billion (2008)
- Owner: Maxwell Farms and Seaboard Corporation
- Number of employees: 5500
- Website: www.butterball.com

Butterball is a brand of turkey and other poultry products produced by Butterball LLC. The company manufactures food products in the United States and internationally—specializing in turkey, cured deli meats, raw roasts and specialty products such as soups and salads, sandwiches, and entrées.

Butterball LLC was a joint venture of Smithfield Foods and Maxwell Farms Inc., an affiliate of the Goldsboro Milling Co. Seaboard Corporation bought Smithfield's stake in Butterball in 2010. The company sells over one billion pounds of turkey a year. Though the Butterball brand has been formally recognized since 1940, Butterball LLC was formed in 2006.

In Canada, the rights to Butterball are owned by Exceldor Foods Ltd.

== Products ==
According to Butterball, the following products are sold under the Butterball name:

- whole turkeys
- turkey cuts
- cold cuts
- sausage
- turkey bacon
- turkey medallions, strips, chicken strips
- turkey franks
- ground turkey
- frozen turkey burgers, mignons, meatballs
- corn dog

Among numerous other brands, English-bred Butterball turkeys are sold in the United Kingdom during Christmas time for the Christmas feast.

== History ==
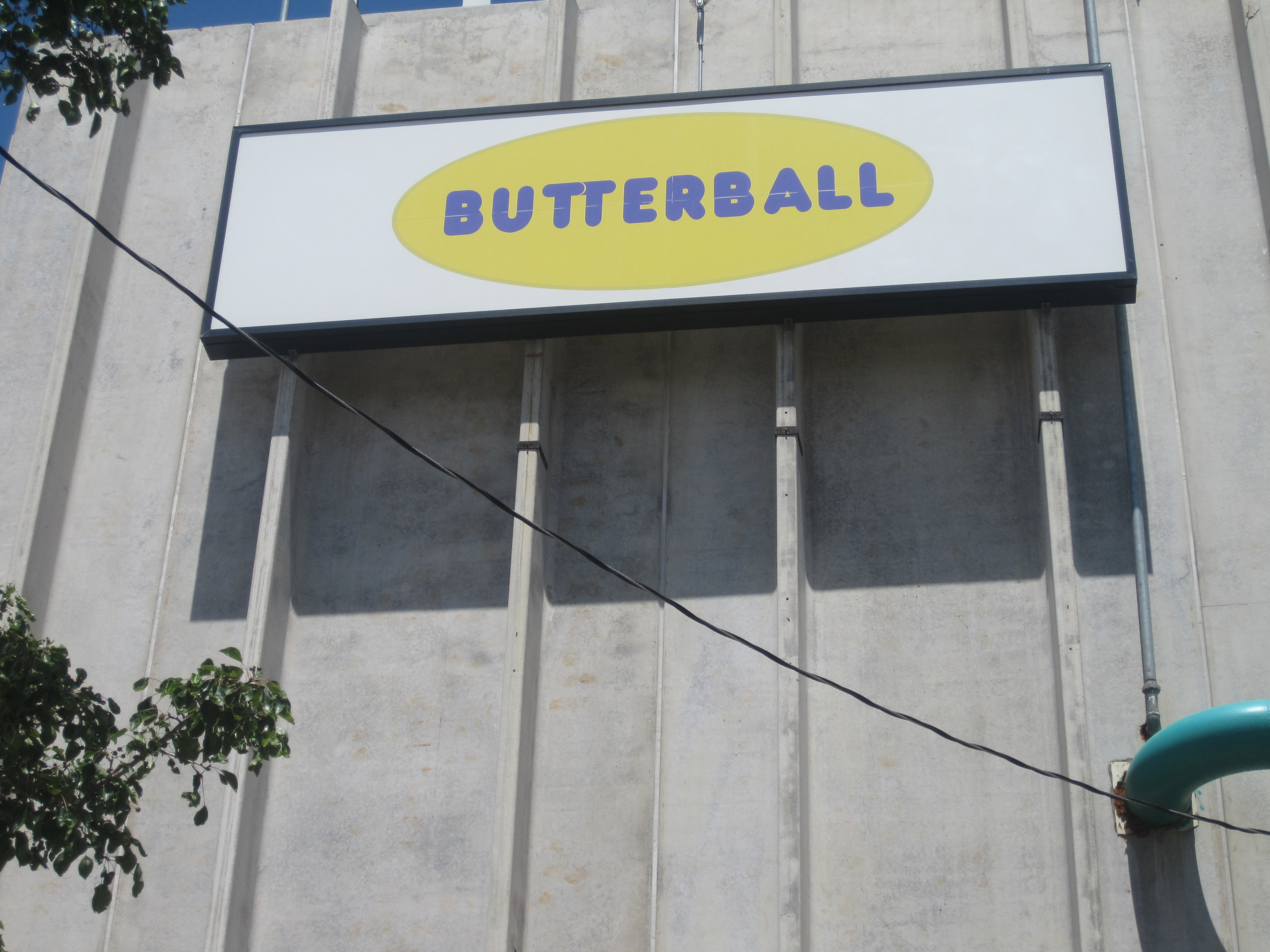
The Butterball plant in downtown Longmont, Colorado

In 1951, Leo Peters, an employee of the Chicago meat processor Swift and Co., purchased the trademark for "Butterball" from an Ohio woman who had owned it since 1940. According to Peters' son, Peters was unsure what he would actually use it for, but by 1954 Peters' trimmed, dressed, and fast-frozen turkeys were patented under the name Butterball Turkey.

According to Butterball's website, "Butterball received its name from the broad breast and plump, round shape of the turkey."

Peters licensed the Butterball name to Swift for ten years before selling it to them in the 1960s, which was acquired by ConAgra in 1990.

Leo Peters retained rights to use the name Butterball Farms for his butter products and the company operates today as Butterball Farms, Inc. (founded in 1950s as Peters Pak), producing and marketing shaped butter products.

In October 2006, ConAgra's Butterball branded turkey business was sold to North Carolina–based Carolina Turkeys, making Carolina Turkey the largest turkey producer in the United States. The company, located southeast of Raleigh, North Carolina, in Mount Olive, North Carolina, on the Wayne and Duplin county line, subsequently renamed itself Butterball LLC.

In 2008, the company moved its headquarters to a new $12 million building in Greenfield North off Interstate 40 in Garner, North Carolina. The headquarters has a "customer experience center" with a special kitchen for promotional demonstrations.

Smithfield offered $200 million to Maxwell Farms for the portion of Butterball that Smithfield did not own. Chief executive C. Larry Pope said at that time that he hoped Maxwell Farms would spend more on the company's facilities and marketing. A decision had to be made whether to buy Maxwell's share or sell Smithfield's. On September 10, 2010, Smithfield announced the sale of its 49 percent share of Butterball for an estimated $175 million. Maxwell Farms will sell 50 percent of Butterball to Seaboard Corp.

== Corporate ==
Walter “Gator” Pelletier, past chairman of the National Turkey Federation, is Butterball LLC's corporate secretary—managing all operating activities from turkey production and directing Maxwell Farms, the managing partner of Butterball. Pelletier is also president of Maxwell Farms, Inc., vice president of Goldsboro Milling Company, and secretary-treasurer of Maxwell Foods, Inc. Pelletier had joined Goldsboro Milling Company in 1981.

== Turkey Talk-Line ==
Beginning in late 1981, Butterball has maintained a toll-free telephone line called the Turkey Talk-Line to help customers with cooking and preparation questions. Eleven thousand people called in 1981, and in recent years the number has grown to over 200,000 each holiday season. The most frequent question asked is how long a turkey takes to defrost.

In The West Wing episode "The Indians in the Lobby", President Josiah Bartlet calls the number (referred to as the "Butterball Hotline" in the script) to discuss stuffing and cooking his Thanksgiving turkey while trying to avoid revealing his identity to the operator (voiced by an uncredited Ana Gasteyer).

In 2013 the Talk-Line began employing men and the company noted that one-quarter of the calls came from men.

== Criticism ==
Animal rights activists such as Mercy for Animals, the Humane Society of the United States, and PETA have accused Butterball of animal cruelty. These organizations cite intentional cruelty inflicted on the birds, as well as the incidental cruelty inherent in the slaughter methods used, and the breeding practices which produce animals too large to reproduce without human intervention.

In October 2012, a Mercy for Animals investigator documented a pattern of abuse and neglect at numerous Butterball turkey operations in North Carolina. The investigation revealed workers kicking and stomping on birds, dragging them by their wings and necks, and throwing turkeys onto the ground or on top of other birds; birds suffering from serious untreated illnesses and injuries, including open sores, infections, and broken bones; and workers grabbing birds by their wings or necks and violently slamming them into tiny transport crates with no regard for their welfare.

This investigation occurred less than one year after a Mercy for Animals undercover investigation into a different Butterball turkey facility led to five workers being charged with criminal cruelty to animals. Mercy for Animals’ 2011 investigation at a Butterball turkey factory farm in Shannon, Hoke County, North Carolina revealed Butterball workers violently kicking and stomping on birds, dragging them by their wings and necks, slamming them into transport crates, and leaving turkeys to suffer from serious untreated injuries and infections. As a result of the investigation, North Carolina officials raided the facility and arrested several employees.

In August 2012, Butterball worker Brian Douglas pleaded guilty to felony cruelty to animals—marking the first-ever felony conviction for cruelty to factory-farmed birds in United States history. Several days later, another Butterball employee, Rueben Mendoza, pleaded guilty to misdemeanor cruelty to animals and felony identity theft.

In February 2013, two more Butterball workers, Terry Johnson and Billy McBride, were found guilty of misdemeanor animal cruelty as a result of MFA's investigation.

In addition to the felony and misdemeanor cruelty convictions, MFA's investigation at Butterball uncovered government corruption. Dr. Sarah Jean Mason, the director of Animal Health Programs with the North Carolina Department of Agriculture, was arrested and pleaded guilty to obstruction of justice charges after admitting to warning Butterball about the raid by law enforcement and potentially compromising the criminal cruelty investigation.

In November 2024, PETA released a video and an accompanying article where undercover employees detailed numerous animal abuses by workers, including sexual assault to the birds as well as excessive violence.
