= Florence A. Cowles =

American cookbook author (1878–1958)

Florence Abigail Cowles (April 7, 1878 - August 22, 1958) was an American journalist and cookbook author. She worked on the editorial staff of Cleveland's daily newspaper, The Plain Dealer, from 1917 until her retirement in 1944. Her 1928 publication, Seven Hundred Sandwiches, along with its later revisions, is a frequently cited source regarding the early development of American sandwich varieties that are now widely prepared and eaten.

== Early life ==
Florence A. Cowles was born in Farmington, Connecticut, to Gustavus and Evelyn (Gridley) Cowles: she was the first of their four children. By 1900, she had found work as a local schoolteacher, according to the census records, and her obituary notes that "around the turn of the century Miss Cowles taught school at Scott Swamp and Cidar Creek."

== Journalism career ==
Cowles began her career at The Plain Dealer in 1917—an article in her hometown newspaper recorded that she was given a position as "editor of the fancy work department" as well as serving as "private secretary for the general manager". An article in the same newspaper in 1928 noted that Cowles remained with The Plain Dealer where she had been "conducting different departments. She has been graphology editor for six years and has written many editorials." She retired from the newspaper in 1944, and was described in her obituary as a "feature and magazine writer" for The Plain Dealer.

== Writing career ==
Prior to her publishing career in cookbooks, Cowles produced a single dramatic work, Where the Lane Turned: A Rural Comedy Drama in Four Acts, which was published in 1912 by the New York publisher, Dick & Fitzgerald.

Her next published book was Seven Hundred Sandwiches, a recipe book published by Little, Brown and Company in 1928. (An abridged edition, entitled Five Hundred Sandwiches, was published in London by Chatto & Windus in 1929; a revised and enlarged edition, entitled 1001 Sandwiches, was published by Little, Brown and Company in 1936.) These books were well received in their era—Good Housekeeping, in reviewing Seven Hundred Sandwiches in March 1929, names the cookbook in a problem-solving column, calling it "helpful" and praising its "multitude of suggestions", while Washington, D.C.'s Evening Star reviewed 1001 Sandwiches equally glowingly in 1936, lauding Cowles for placing "the gems of her collection at the disposal of the public" and commenting favorably on the book's "almost limitless variety". Since that time, Cowles has remained an important source of information regarding sandwich-making in this era: her work is cited multiple times in The Oxford Encyclopedia of Food and Drink in America, and her recipes appear in less formal settings also, as local delis, cooking advice websites, and online magazines refer to her books for historical information about the origin or development of specific sandwich varieties.

Cowles's final published book was a work co-authored with Florence LaGanke Harris, also a writer and editor at The Plain Dealer. The cookbook, entitled 400 Salads, was published by Little, Brown and Company in 1944, and reissued in 1950 and 1954. The year it was first published, food writer Gaynor Maddox praised the book's "fine ideas for making the most of every kind of salad ingredient."
