= Turkey as food =

Meat from a turkey

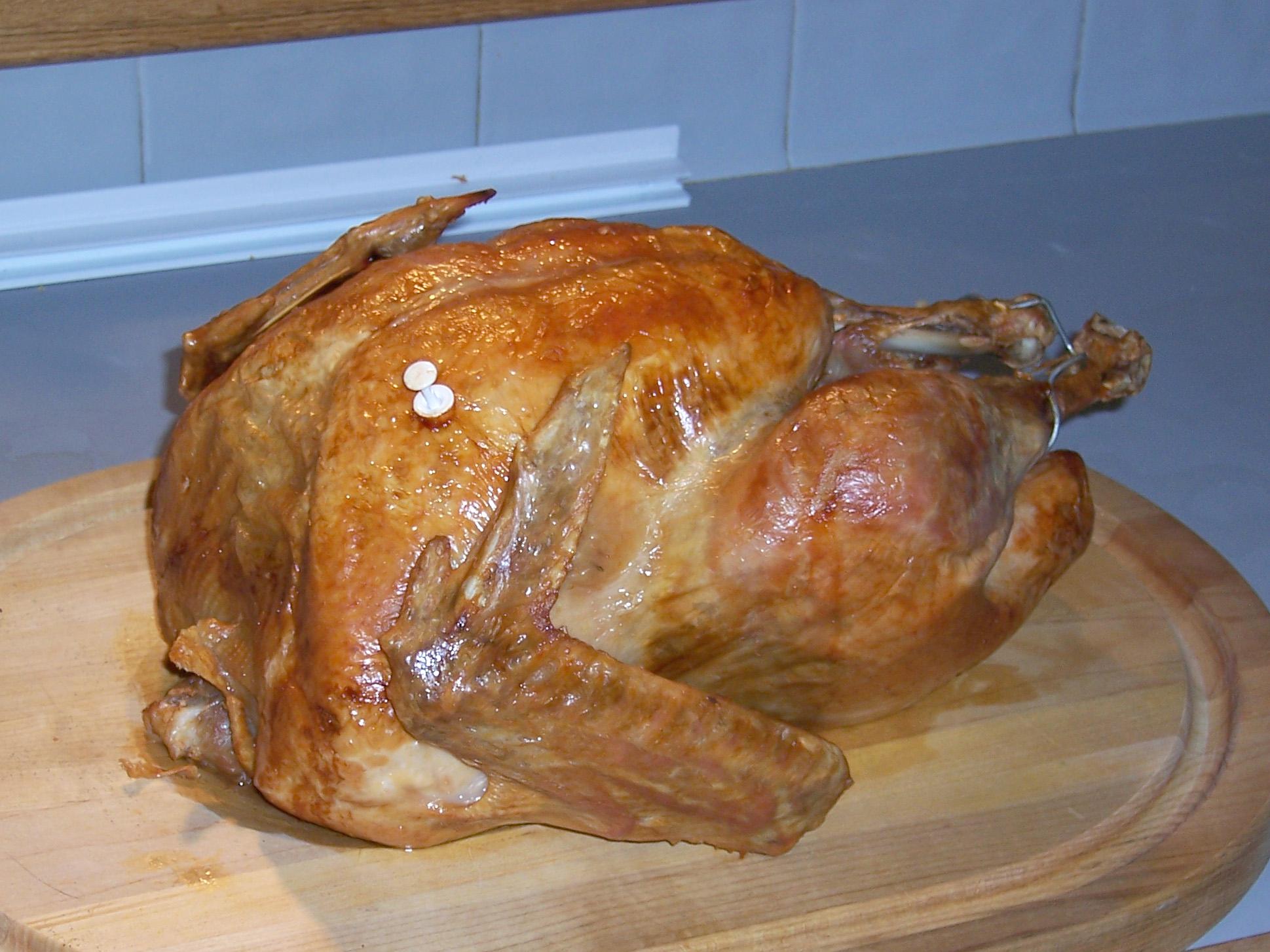
A roast turkey prepared for a traditional U.S. Thanksgiving meal. The white plastic object in the breast is a pop-up thermometer.

Turkey meat, commonly referred to simply as turkey, is the meat from turkeys, typically domesticated ones, but also wild turkeys. It is a popular poultry dish, especially in North America and the United Kingdom, where it is traditionally consumed as part of culturally significant events such as Thanksgiving and Christmas as well as in standard cuisine.

== Production and preparation ==
Turkeys are sold sliced and ground, as well as whole in a manner similar to chicken with the head, feet, and feathers removed. Turkey crowns are the breast of the bird with its legs and wings removed. Frozen whole turkeys remain popular. Sliced turkey is frequently used as a sandwich meat or served as cold cuts; in some cases where recipes call for chicken, it can be used as a substitute. Ground turkey is sold and frequently marketed as a healthy alternative to ground beef. Without careful preparation, cooked turkey is usually considered to end up less moist than other poultry meats such as chicken or duck.

Wild turkeys, while technically the same species as domesticated turkeys, have a very different taste from farm-raised turkeys. Almost all of the meat is dark (including the breast) with a more intense flavor. The flavor can also vary seasonally with changes in available forage, often leaving wild turkey meat with a gamier flavor in late summer, due to the greater number of insects in its diet over the preceding months. Wild turkey that has fed predominantly on grass and grain has a milder flavor. Older heritage breeds also differ in flavor. Traditionally raised English turkey meat has been granted the EU and UK designation Traditional Speciality Guaranteed under the name Traditional Farmfresh Turkey.

A large amount of turkey meat is processed. It can be smoked, and as such, is sometimes sold as turkey ham or turkey bacon. Twisted helices of deep-fried turkey meat, sold as "turkey twizzlers", came to prominence in the UK in 2004, when chef Jamie Oliver campaigned to have them and similar foods removed from school dinners.

Unlike chicken eggs, turkey eggs are not commonly sold as food due to the high demand for whole turkeys and lower output of eggs as compared with other fowl (not only chickens, but even ducks or quail). A single turkey egg costs about $2–3.

Production of turkey meat

Production of turkey meat per animal

== Cultural traditions ==
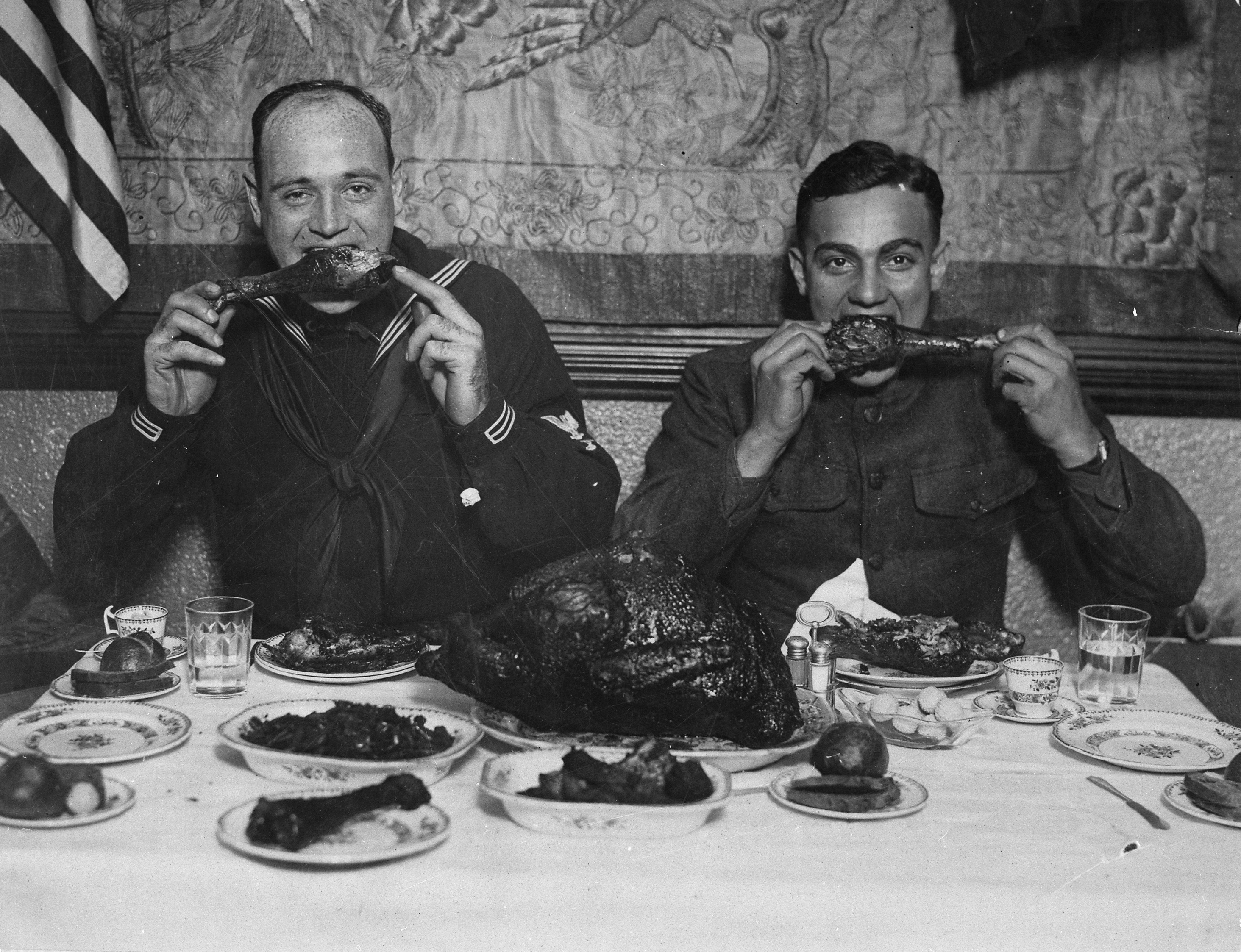
US servicemen eating turkey at a Thanksgiving dinner after the end of World War I (1918)

Turkeys are traditionally eaten as the main course of Thanksgiving dinner feasts in the United States and Canada, and at Christmas dinner feasts in much of the rest of the world (often as stuffed turkey).

Turkey meat has been eaten by indigenous peoples from Mexico, Central America, and the southern tier of the United States since antiquity. In the 15th century, Spanish conquistadores took Aztec turkeys back to Europe. In his 1825 culinary treatise The Physiology of Taste, French lawyer and gourmand Jean Anthelme Brillat-Savarin described turkey as "surely one of the prettiest presents which the Old World has received from the New."

Turkey was eaten in as early as the 16th century in England. Before the 20th century, pork ribs were the most common food for the North American holidays, as the animals were usually slaughtered in November. Turkeys were once so abundant in the wild that they were eaten throughout the year, the food considered commonplace, whereas pork ribs were rarely available outside of the Thanksgiving–New Year season. While the tradition of turkey at Christmas spread throughout Britain in the 17th century, among the working classes, it became common to serve goose, which remained the predominant roast until the Victorian era.

Turkey with mole sauce is regarded as part of regional dishes of Mexico, and turkey rice as one of Taiwan's.

Because the turkey is a New World bird not known to the Jewish people until after the completion of the Hebrew Bible and Talmud, questions about its kosher status have been discussed for years. The majority of authorities and a long history of Jewish usage have regarded it as kosher, as other related fowl such as chicken, partridge, and pheasant are.

Turkeys have been raised in Finland since the 1950s, and consumption is at its highest at Christmas time. Turkey farming is mainly concentrated in Western Finland, with the Satakunta region producing over 98% of Finnish turkey meat.

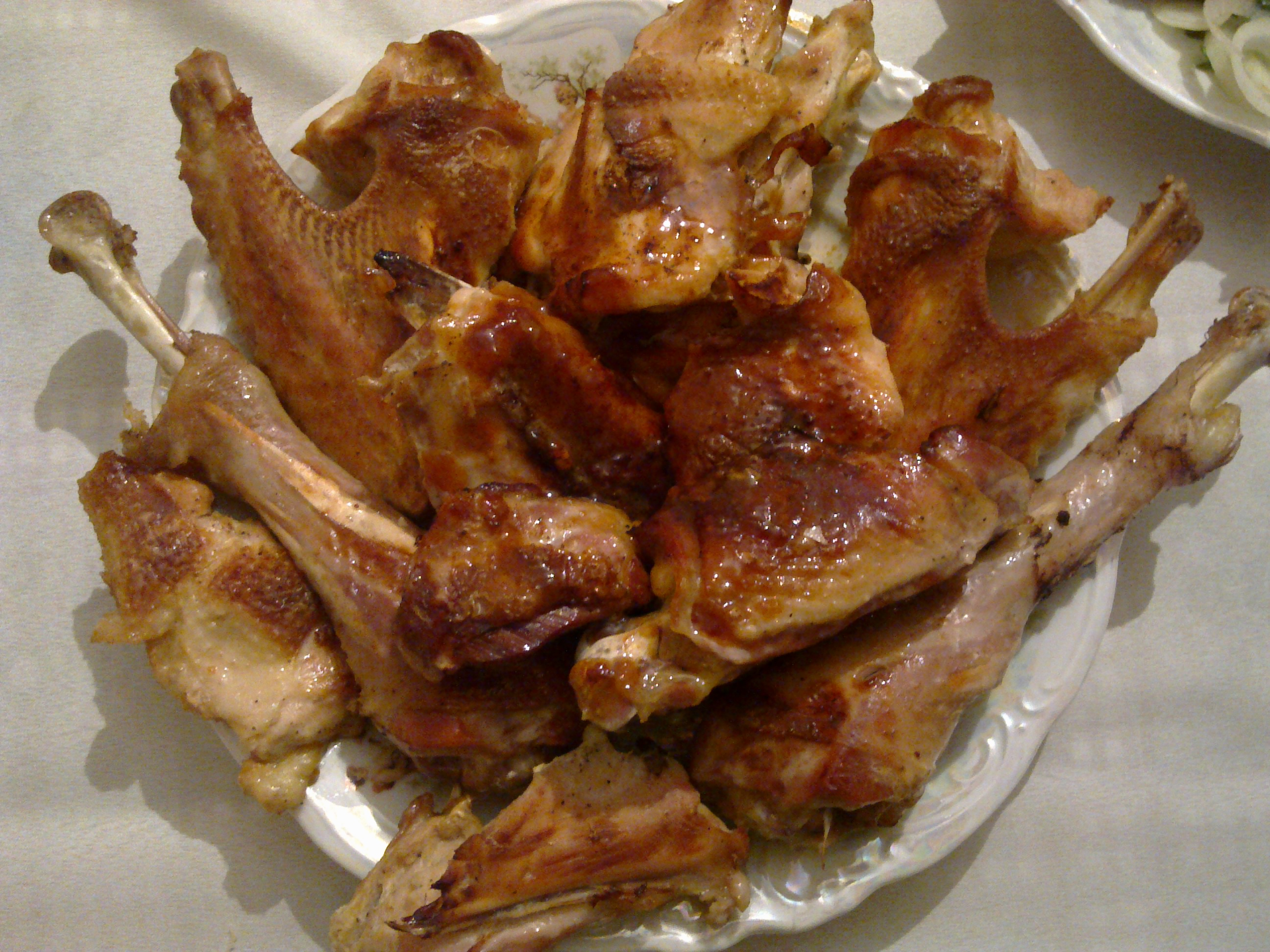
Roast turkey

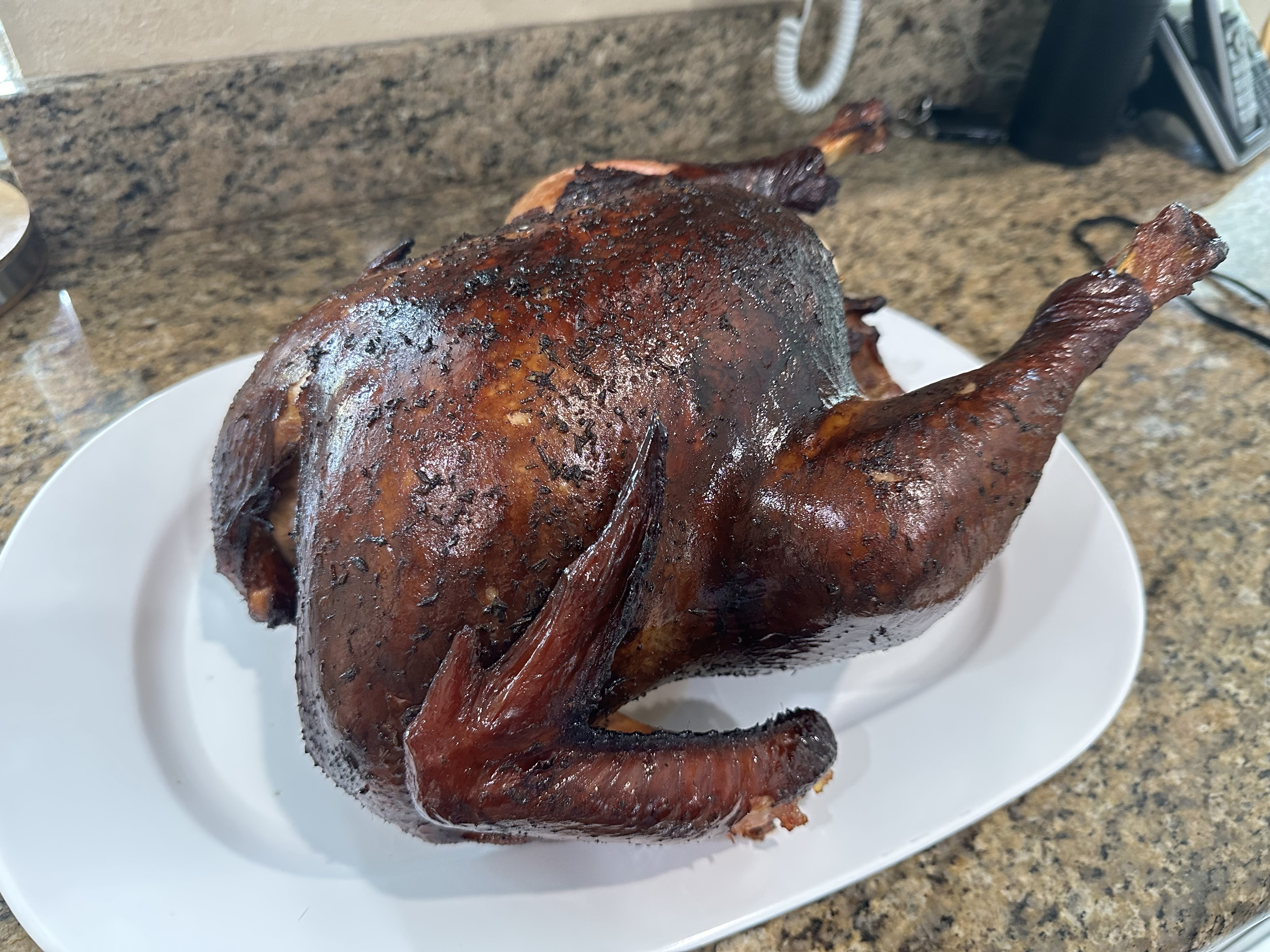
A whole smoked turkey cooked for Thanksgiving dinner.

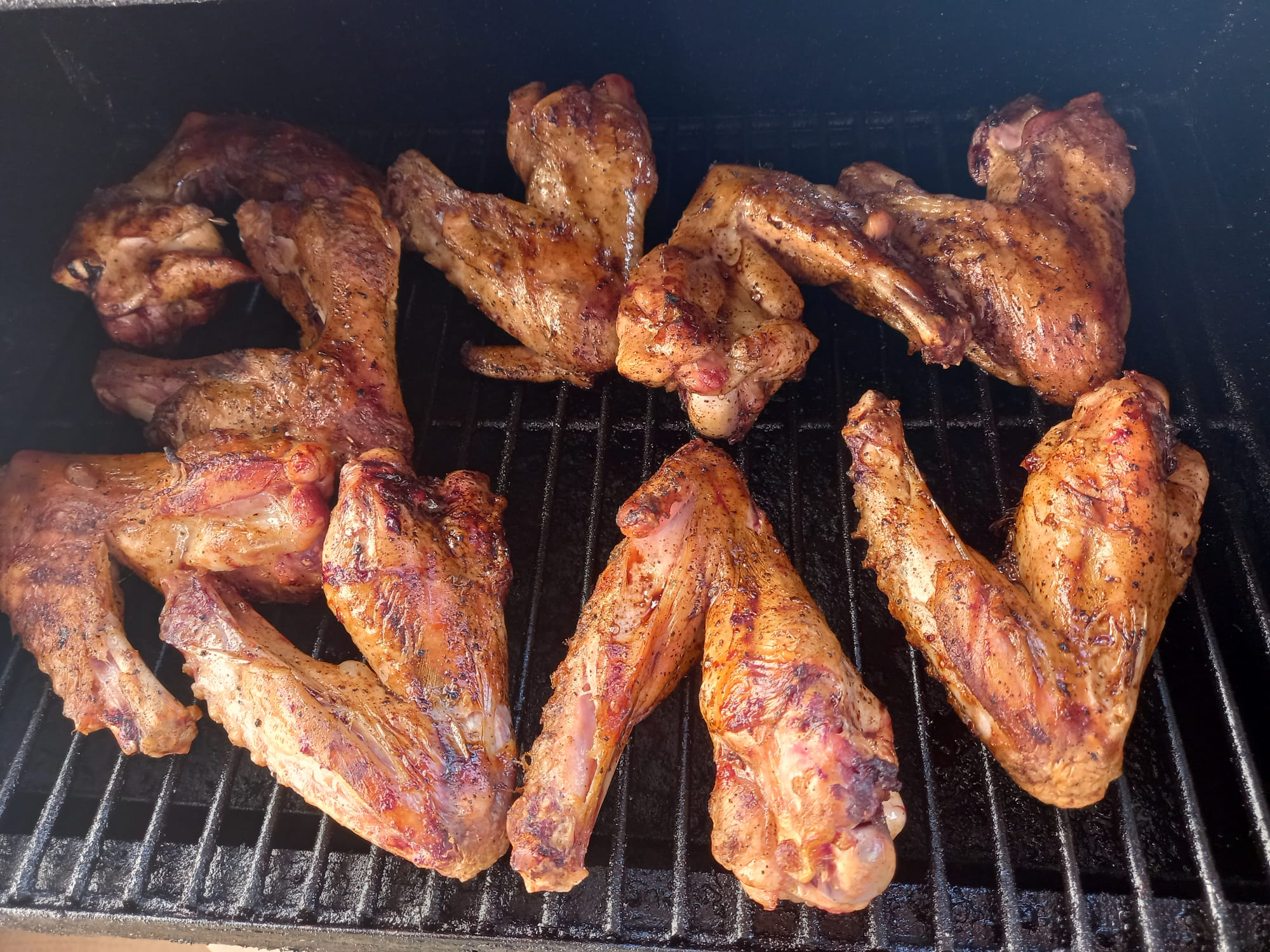
Turkey wings being smoked on a barbecue

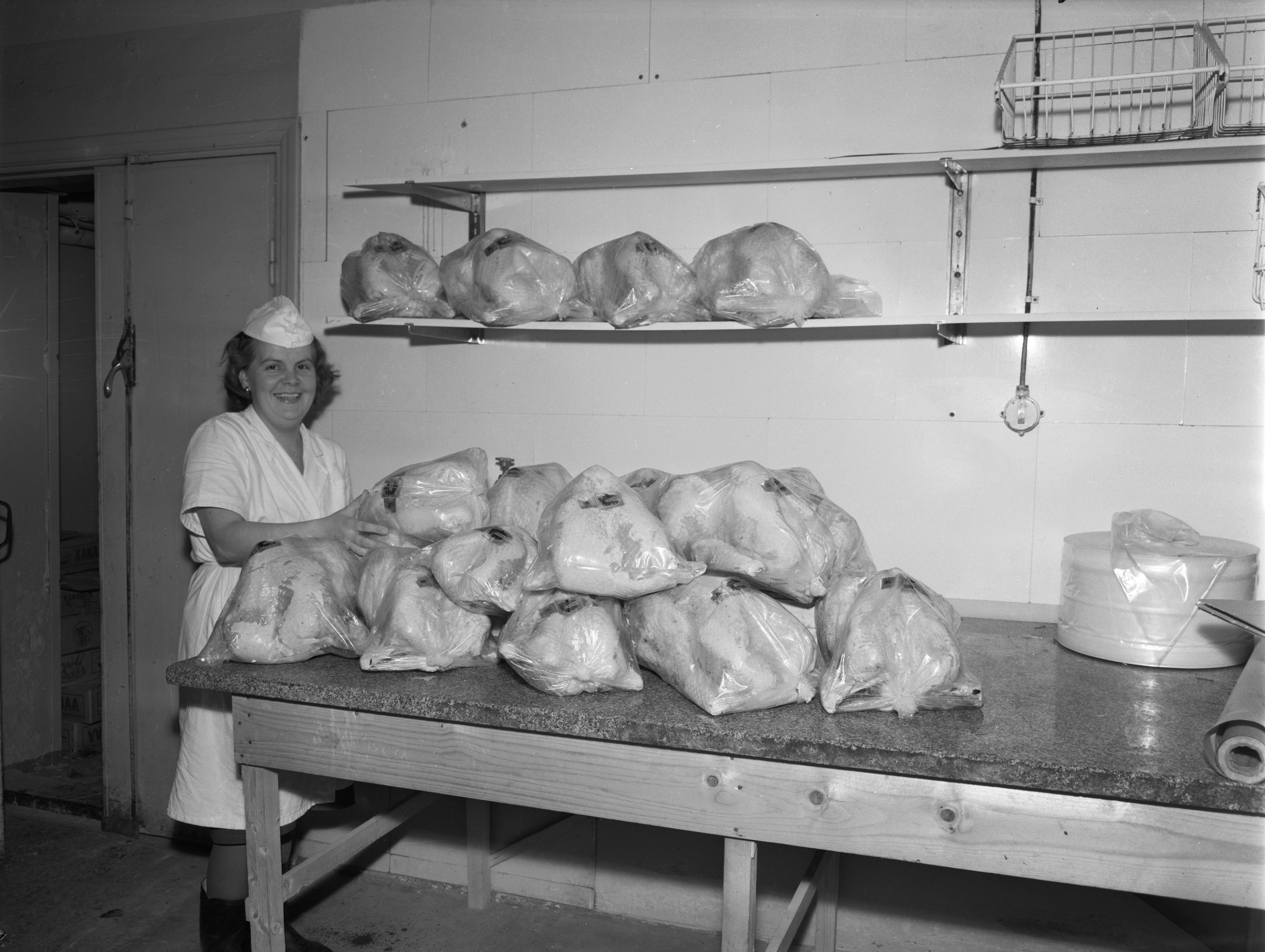
Preparing the turkey deliveries at ESO in Kerava, Finland in 1963

== Cooking ==
Turkey, breast, meat only, raw
Nutritional value per 100 g (3.5 oz)
- Energy: 465 kJ (111 kcal)
- Carbohydrates: 0 g
- Sugars: 0 g
- Dietary fiber: 0 g
- Fat: 0.7 g
- Protein: 24.6 g
Vitamins and minerals
Vitamins	Quantity %DV^{†}
Thiamine (B1)	0% 0 mg
Riboflavin (B2)	8% 0.1 mg
Niacin (B3)	41% 6.6 mg
Pantothenic acid (B5)	14% 0.7 mg
Vitamin B6	35% 0.6 mg
Folate (B9)	2% 8 μg
Vitamin C	0% 0 mg
Minerals	Quantity %DV^{†}
Calcium	1% 10 mg
Iron	7% 1.2 mg
Magnesium	7% 28 mg
Phosphorus	16% 206 mg
Potassium	10% 293 mg
Sodium	2% 49 mg
Zinc	11% 1.2 mg
- Other constituents: Quantity
- Water: 74 g
- Link to USDA Database entry
- ^{†}Percentages estimated using US recommendations for adults, except for potassium, which is estimated based on expert recommendation from the National Academies.

Turkeys are usually baked or roasted in an oven for several hours, often while the cook prepares the remainder of the meal. Sometimes, a turkey is brined before roasting to enhance flavor and moisture content. This is done because the dark meat requires a higher temperature to denature all of the myoglobin pigment than the white meat (very low in myoglobin), so that fully cooking the dark meat tends to dry out the breast. Brining makes it possible to fully cook the dark meat without drying the breast meat. Turkeys are sometimes decorated with turkey frills, paper frills or "booties" that are placed on the end of drumsticks or bones of other cutlets.

In some areas, particularly the American South, they may also be deep fried in hot oil (often peanut oil) for 30 to 45 minutes by using a turkey fryer. Deep frying turkey has become something of a fad, with hazardous consequences for those unprepared to safely handle the large quantities of hot oil required.

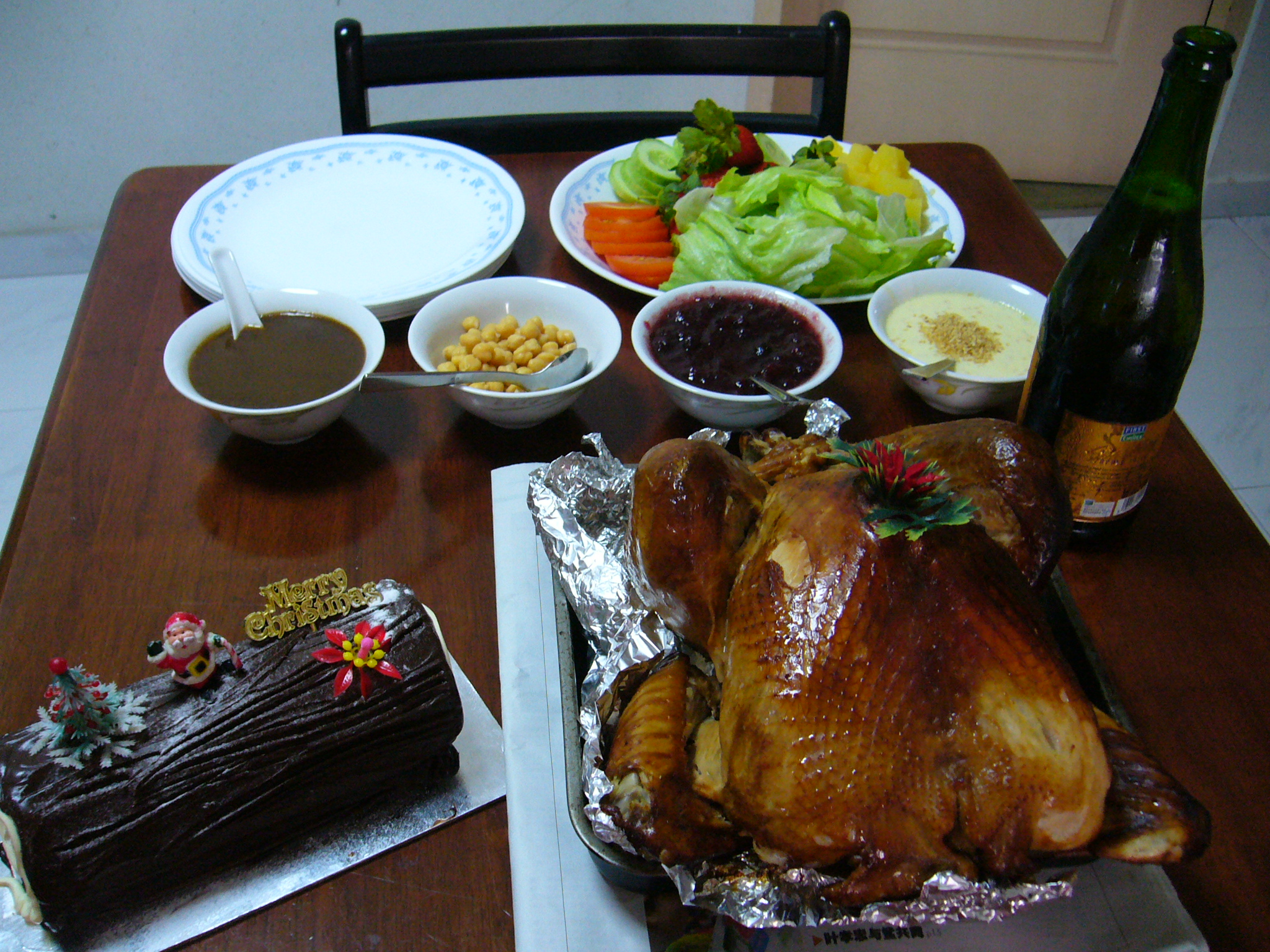
Roast turkey served with salad, sauces, sparkling apple juice, and Yule Log cake during a Christmas dinner feast

=== Nutrition ===
When raw, turkey breast meat is 74% water, 25% protein, 1% fat, and contains no carbohydrates (table). In a 100-gram (3 1/2-ounce) reference amount, turkey breast supplies 465 kilojoules (111 kilocalories) of food energy, and contains high amounts (20% or more of the Daily Value, DV) of protein, niacin, vitamin B6, and phosphorus, with moderate content (10–19% DV) of pantothenic acid and zinc.

A 100 gram amount of turkey breast contains 279 mg of tryptophan, a low content compared to other amino acids in turkey breast meat. There is no scientific evidence that this amount of tryptophan from turkey causes post-meal drowsiness.

Protein content of meats
Meat	Protein (100 g)
Salami	13.0
Pork sausages (grilled)	13.3
Ground beef	23.1
Roast chicken	24.8
Grilled lean, back bacon	25.3
Roast turkey	25.0

== Accompaniments ==
For Thanksgiving in the United States, turkey is traditionally served stuffed or with dressing (on the side), with cranberry sauce and gravy. Common complementary dishes include mashed potatoes, corn on the cob, green beans, squash, and sweet potatoes. Pie is the usual dessert, especially those made from pumpkins, apples, or pecans. It can also be eaten at Christmas in the United States and North America.

For Christmas in the United Kingdom, turkey is traditionally served with winter vegetables, including roast potatoes, Brussels sprouts, and parsnips. Cranberry sauce is the traditional condiment in the northern rural areas of the United Kingdom where wild cranberries grow. In the south and in urban areas, where cranberries until recently were difficult to obtain, bread sauce was used in its place, but the availability of commercial cranberry sauce has seen a rise in its popularity in these areas, too. Pigs in blankets, a dish consisting of small sausages (usually chipolatas) wrapped in bacon are a popular and traditional accompaniment.

Especially during holiday seasons around Thanksgiving and Christmas, stuffing or dressing is traditionally served with turkey. The many varieties include oatmeal, chestnut, sage and onion (flavored bread), cornbread, and sausage are the most traditional. Stuffing is used to stuff the turkey (as the name implies) or may be cooked separately and served as a side dish (dressing).

== See also ==
Media related to Turkey meat at Wikimedia Commons

- Pava borracha
- List of stuffed dishes
