= This Is Why You're Fat =

Food website

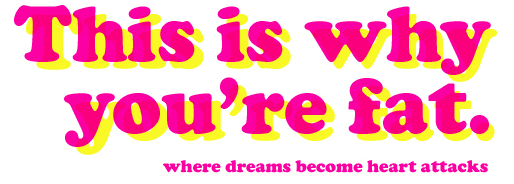
- Available in: English
- Owners: Richard Blakeley and Jessica Amason
- Creator: Various human beings
- Website: thisiswhyyourefat.com
- Registration: None
- Current status: Offline

This Is Why You're Fat (stylized in sentence case) was a website featuring submitted photos of over-the-top and extremely indulgent food creations. The website of captioned pictures is subtitled "where dreams become heart attacks", and it has been covered by newspapers in the United States, Canada, and Germany. The website was not updated since 2018 and now has been taken down.

It was co-created by Richard Blakeley, video editor for Gawker Media, and Jessica Amason, Viral Media Editor for BuzzFeed. In just over a month since it was launched the website had an "astonishing" 10 million page views and its creators are "in talks to create a book version and exploring TV development deals."

== Content of website ==
The items featured on This Is Why You're Fat had been described as "culinary Frankensteins" and "items with no nutritional value." They had included a 30 kg rice cereal square and other culinary creations with names like "The Homewrecker" (a deep-fried, mega hot dog with the works) and Meat Cake (a three-layer meatloaf patisserie iced with mashed potatoes and ketchup). Highlights of the website included the "30,000 Calorie Sandwich" made of minced beef, bacon, corn dogs, ham, pastrami, roast beef, bratwurst, Braunschweiger, turkey, fried mushrooms, with onion rings and five varieties of cheese, served on white bread, and the Mega Mel Burger made from 1½ pounds of beef, 1 pound of bacon, a quarter pound of cheese and "fixin's", as well as traditional ethnic dishes like fried chicken skin (gribenes), khachapuri, poutine, Welsh rarebit, and lechon kawali.

The dishes pictured caused one writer to be nauseated and to wonder, "How bad could a plate of fried chicken skin be? All the flavor of fried chicken, without the pesky chicken. (Squeal of delight) Is that Spam?!'" The fat content and health considerations are a concern; as one humor columnist remarked, "you probably shouldn't eat an Oreo with more than 30 layers of double-stuff cream precariously piled between its two chocolate wafers. Probably."

== Expanding offline ==
In March 2009, it was announced that This Is Why You're Fat signed a book deal with HarperCollins' experimental imprint HarperStudio.

== See also ==
- Bacon explosion
- Bacon mania
- Bacone
- Chicken fried bacon
- Chocolate covered bacon
- Epic Meal Time
- List of websites about food and drink
- Turducken
