= Baconianism =

Baconianism may refer to:

- Baconian method, scientific methods theorised by Francis Bacon
- Baconian theory of Shakespeare authorship, the theory that Francis Bacon wrote the works of Shakespeare

== See also ==
- Francis Bacon (1561–1626), English philosopher
- Baconian cipher, a method of steganography devised by Francis Bacon
- Bacon mania, a trend of enthusiasm for bacon in the US and Canada
