= Bacon mania =

Enthusiasm for bacon in North America

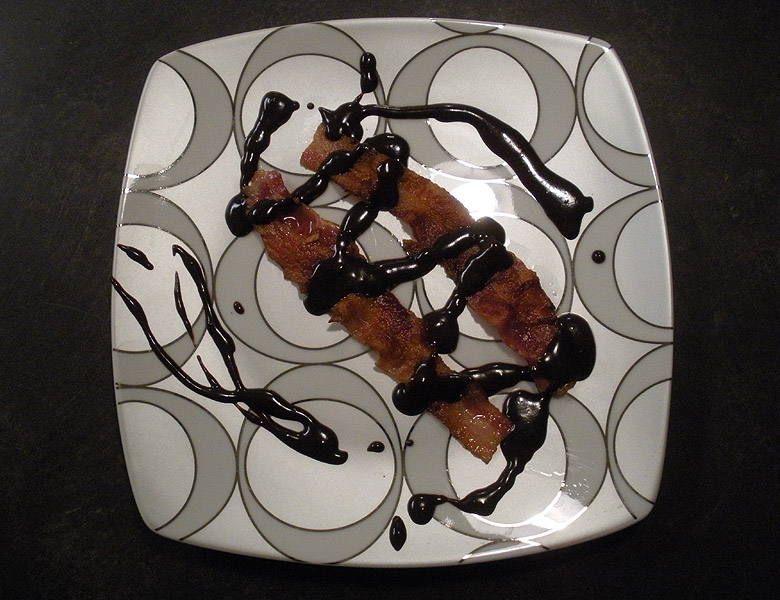
Bacon drizzled with a melted chocolate bar, a form of chocolate-covered bacon

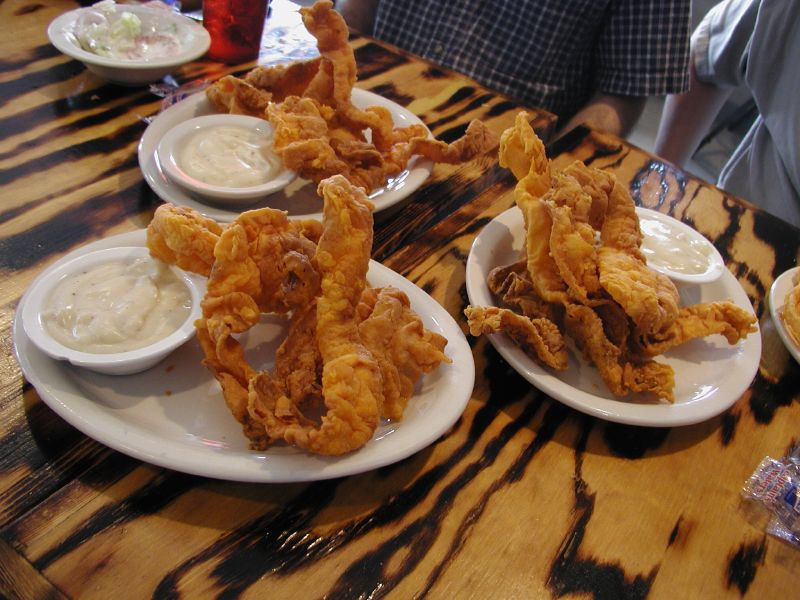
Sodolak's chicken-fried bacon

Bacon mania is passionate for bacon in the United States and Canada. Novelty bacon dishes and other bacon-related items have been spread rapidly via the internet.

The movement has been traced to the late 1990s when high-protein foods became a more prominent diet focus due in part to the Atkins diet. Since then, bacon-focused events and gatherings celebrating the food have been reported and bacon-related exploits have been featured in the media. Many have criticized bacon mania due to the promotion of processed meats.

== Innovation ==
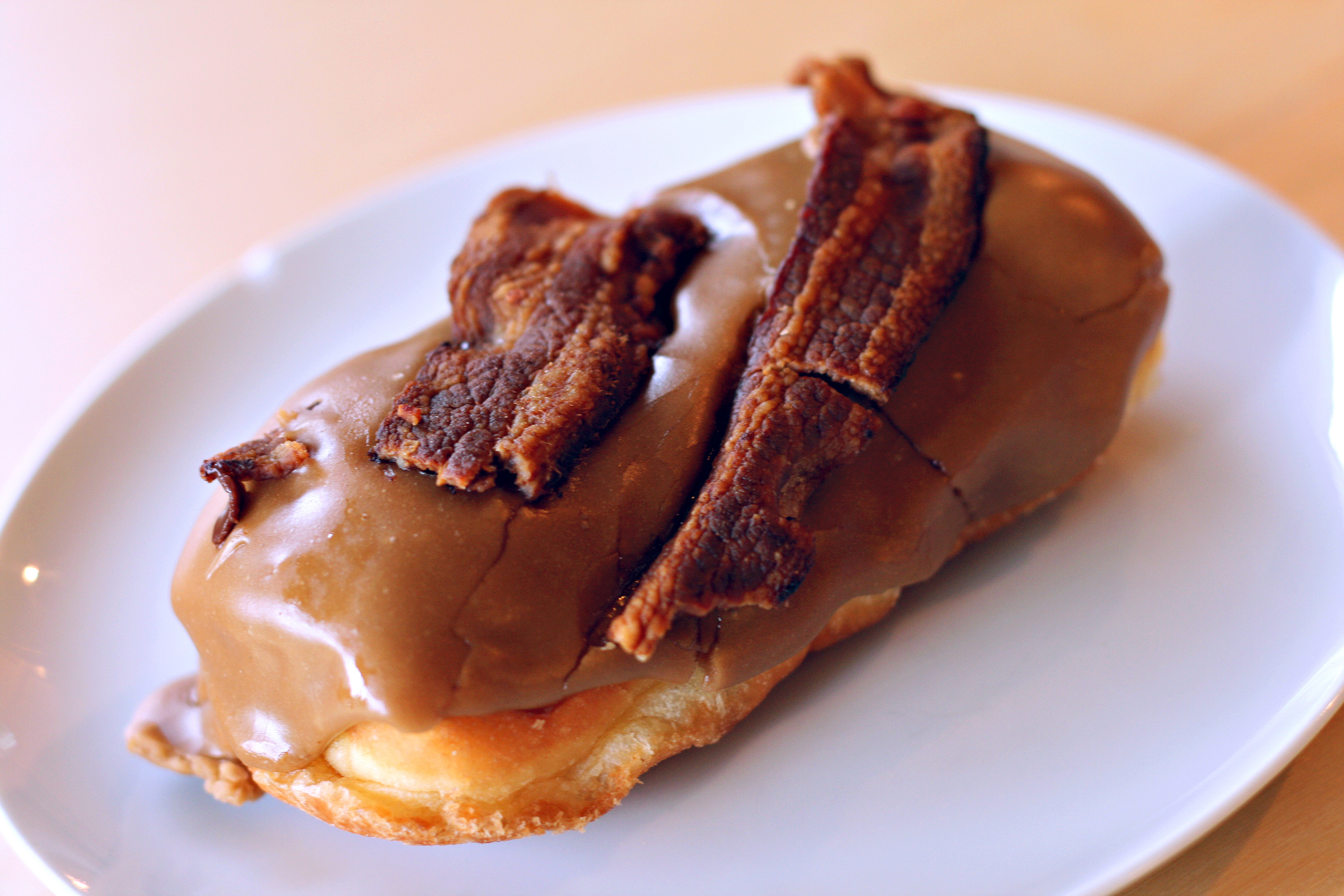
A Bacon Maple Bar from Voodoo Doughnut, Portland, Oregon

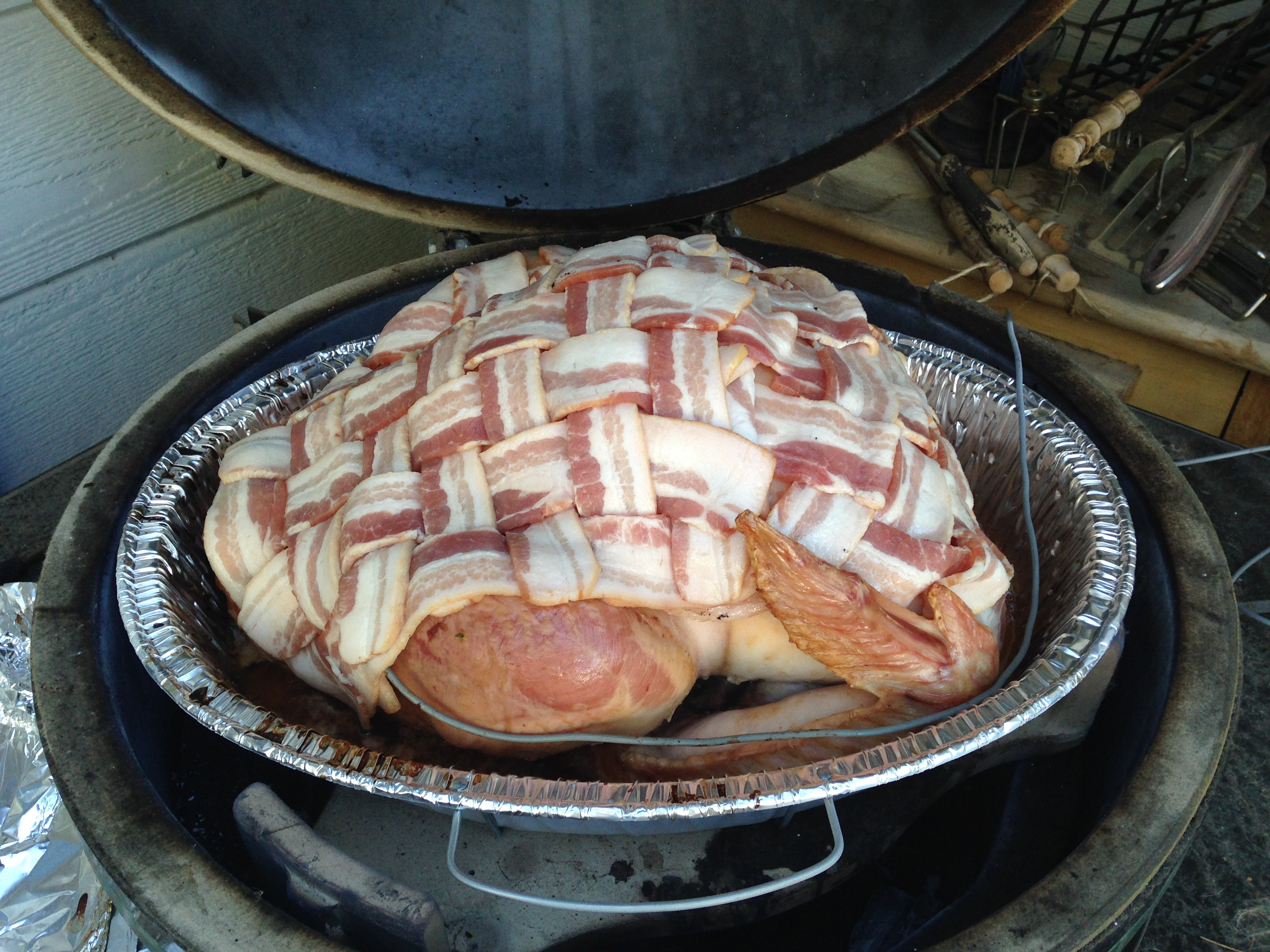
A bacon wrapped turkey just prior to cooking in a kamado oven

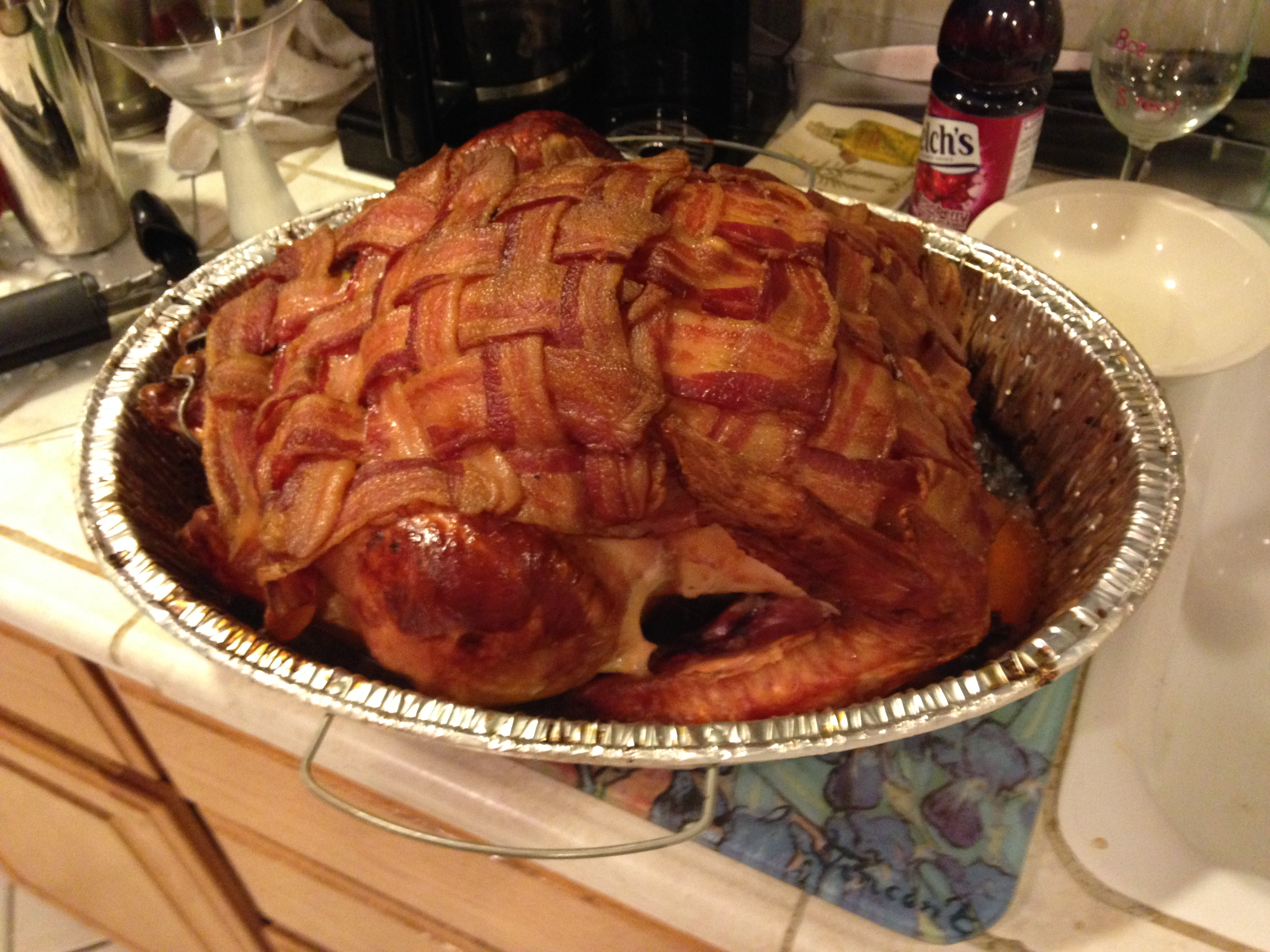
Barbecued bacon wrapped turkey

Newer bacon creations have joined more traditional foods like the BLT, Cobb salad, clams casino, and club sandwich. Dishes include hard-boiled eggs coated in mayonnaise encased in bacon (the "heart attack snack") and Wendy's 'Baconator' (six strips of bacon on a half-pound cheeseburger). The growing popularity of bacon has also encouraged product introductions such as bacon salt, maple bacon donuts, and baconnaise.

Bacon food oddities include the bacon explosion ("a barbecued meat brick composed of 2 pounds of bacon wrapped around 2 pounds of sausage"), chicken-fried bacon, bacon-infused vodka, bacon ice cream, bacon jerky, and chocolate-covered bacon, all popularized over the internet.

Bacon has been adapted into products including bacon bubble gum, bacon band-aids, sizzling-bacon-flavored rolling papers, and bacon air freshener. A bacon alarm clock that wakes people up with the smell of cooking bacon has been announced.

A 2009 story in The Baltimore Sun describes bacon as being "more than bacon," and stated that for "obsessive and adoring Bacon Nation it's about cheap thrills and a chance for Internet fame." Calling it "like an extreme sport", the article described the innovators and enthusiasts celebrating bacon in all its incarnations.

== Organization ==
The increased interest in bacon has led to Bacon-of-the-month clubs, bacon recipe contests, blogs, a dating app for bacon lovers, and even "bacon camps." Seattle hosted a "bacon camp" where bacon was included in an assortment of bacon dishes and other bacon-related items. Bacon has even been referred to as a fashion statement after a bacon bra was photographed.

The Portland Monthly noted that "Bacon is such a quintessential breakfast staple, even vegetarians stake a claim to their own versions." A website called "Bacon Today" was started to provide updates about bacon related happenings.

The San Francisco Weekly reported on the first "BaconCamp" held "in solidarity with the growing popularity of events (see the recent Grilled Cheese Invitational)" and reported that the event "demonstrated just how much of a high bacon is currently on in terms of notoriety and how far people are able to stretch one culinary theme". The event included lectures on bacon as art, a PowerPoint presentation of the Obacon project (a recreation of the famous Obama Hope poster), as well as judging and awards. The slide show from the event includes a wide range of innovative food and decorative bacon entities. The San Francisco Weekly advised those attending to live, breathe, and smell like it and to bring a bacon dish.

== Events ==
In and around Baltimore, Maryland, bacon has featured at various eating and drinking establishments. There is a "clamoring" for the bacon happy hour at Bad Decisions bar in Fells Point which includes a menu that is completely redone with bacon dishes and big bowls of bacon served on the bar (using up to 30 pounds of bacon in a two-hour period). A café in Hampden offers the Bacon Bulleit, a cocktail of bourbon, lemon, and maple syrup, "with applewood smoked bacon replacing the swizzle stick."

The "Bacon Takedown" competition in Brooklyn, New York, was held March 29, 2009, and featured 30 contestants vying for the best bacon dish. The winner was bourbon-bacon ice cream. The "Bacon Mania" ABC News segment covered the event and noted that $2 billion in bacon was sold in the United States in 2008 and that "with the bacon business booming... you might say our love affair with the breakfast meat is more passionate than ever".

On February 28, 2009, the second annual Blue Ribbon Bacon Festival in Des Moines, Iowa, hosted a sell-out event for more than 300 people. First held March 1, 2008, on National Pig Day, it was founded by Brooks Reynolds, and the 2013 sold 8000 tickets in three minutes.

Humor about bacon includes an April Fools' Day story about a putative all-bacon restaurant and the supposed creation of "squeezable bacon" including a video advertisement.

A group of graduate students in Boulder, Colorado, established an International Bacon Day celebration.

In Portland, Oregon, there are multiple bacon events each year, including Portland Baconfest. These are described as "some of the happiest places in the world" by attendees. These events focus on fun just as much as bacon.

== Possible decline ==
Negative publicity surrounding swine flu, although not transmitted via pork product consumption, hit sales and prices in the pork industry in 2009. Heather Lauer, author of Bacon: A Love Story, said of the impact, "Bacon has been around for thousands of years. It has survived numerous health scares. Anyone who attempts to capitalize on this recent event in an effort to destroy the best meat ever will fail." Efforts to alleviate flu concerns and fight back against the anti-pork and bacon tide were reported.

== See also ==
- List of bacon dishes
- Seduced by Bacon, a book on the subject
- Heather Lauer, the author of the Bacon Unwrapped blog and book on bacon
- 2010s in food
