= Jack Link's =

American snack company

Link Snacks, Inc.
- Type: Private
- Industry: Food manufacturing
- Founded: Minong, Wisconsin, United States (1986; 40 years ago)
- Founder: John 'Jack' Link
- Headquarters: Minong, Wisconsin, United States of America
- Area served: Worldwide
- Key people: Jack Link; Troy Link
- Products: Beef jerky, bacon jerky
- Website: Official Website

Link Snacks, Inc., better known as Jack Link's Protein Snacks, or simply Jack Link's, is an American snack company best known as the producer and marketer of the eponymous brand of beef jerky. It was founded by John 'Jack' Link in 1986, using the recipes of his great-grandfather, Chris Link, a master sausage maker from Germany. They are known for their "Messin' with Sasquatch" ads.

In addition to their original facility in Minong, Wisconsin, the company also has facilities in North America including in New Glarus, Wisconsin; Alpena, South Dakota; Mankato, Minnesota; Laurens, Iowa; Underwood, Iowa; Mississauga, Ontario; Perry, Georgia and its marketing office in Minneapolis.

On April 1, 2014, Jack Link's bought Unilever's meat snack division in an attempt to expand its consumer base into Europe. The purchase includes the BiFi brand, sold across Europe and Peperami, which retails in the UK, Ireland and Mexico; and the manufacturing unit in Ansbach, Germany.

In addition to traditional beef jerky, the company also manufactures bacon jerky, made with salt-and-sugar cured pork meat.

In 2019 Jack Links acquired the Golden Island brand from Tyson Foods.

== Advertising ==
In 2013, they signed a sponsorship deal with the Seattle Mariners. In April 2015 Jack Link's Beef Jerky changed its logo "to better represent the brand’s 'Feed Your Wild Side' positioning and overall appeal." This new logo was designed by Davis Design of Mississauga, Ontario. In 2017, Jack Link's extended its "Messin' with Sasquatch" ad campaign to feature NBA player Karl-Anthony Towns. The company also employs a nutritionist, Christina Meyer-Jax, to explain the dietary value of protein as part of their marketing.

== Controversy ==
In December 2021, six European supermarket chains, including two owned by the Dutch firm Ahold Delhaize and a Carrefour subsidiary, said they would stop selling some or all beef products from Brazil. The companies' decision was made due to suspected ties with the clearing of segments of the Amazon rainforest for local cattle farming. JBS, the world's largest meatpacker, and Jack Link's each source cattle from Brazil.
