= Bacon Grill =

Canned meat product made from chopped and cured pork

Bacon Grill is a canned meat product made from chopped and cured pork (and sometimes chicken), seasoned to be similar in flavour to bacon. It is produced by several companies, including Princes for the British market, in the style of Spam and corned beef. Bacon Grill was a standard element of rations in the British Army.

== Ingredients ==
The specific ingredients of Bacon Grill vary across manufacturers.

Celebrity Bacon Grill (purchased in February 2011) lists:

- Pork (64%), water, starch, pork fat, pork rind, salt, Milk Protein, Stabiliser (Sodium Triphosphorate), smoke flavour, sugar, preservative (Sodium Nitrite), Spice extracts.

whereas Princes Bacon Grill ingredients list is:

- Pork (43%), mechanically recovered chicken (16%), water, wheat starch, pork fat, pork rind, salt, sodium caseinate, stabilisers (E412, E451(i)), smoke flavoring, pepper extract, antioxidant (E316), preservative (E250).

and Plumrose Bacon Grill lists:

- Pork (43%), mechanically recovered pork, water, pork fat, maize starch, pork rind, salt, milk protein, stabiliser (sodium triphosphate), smoke flavour, sugar, preservative (sodium nitrite), spice extracts.

ASDA Bacon Grill (2018)

- Pork (65%), water, potato starch, pork fat, pork rind, salt, sodium caseinate (from milk), stabiliser (triphosphates), smoke flavouring, sugar, preservative (sodium nitrite), spice extracts (coriander, ginger, nutmeg, pepper)

Tulip Bacon Grill (2024)

- Pork (64%), water, starch, pork fat, pork rind, salt, milk protein, stabiliser (sodium triphosphate), smoke flavour, sugar, preservative (sodium nitrite), spice extracts.
