= BiFi =

Meat snack brand

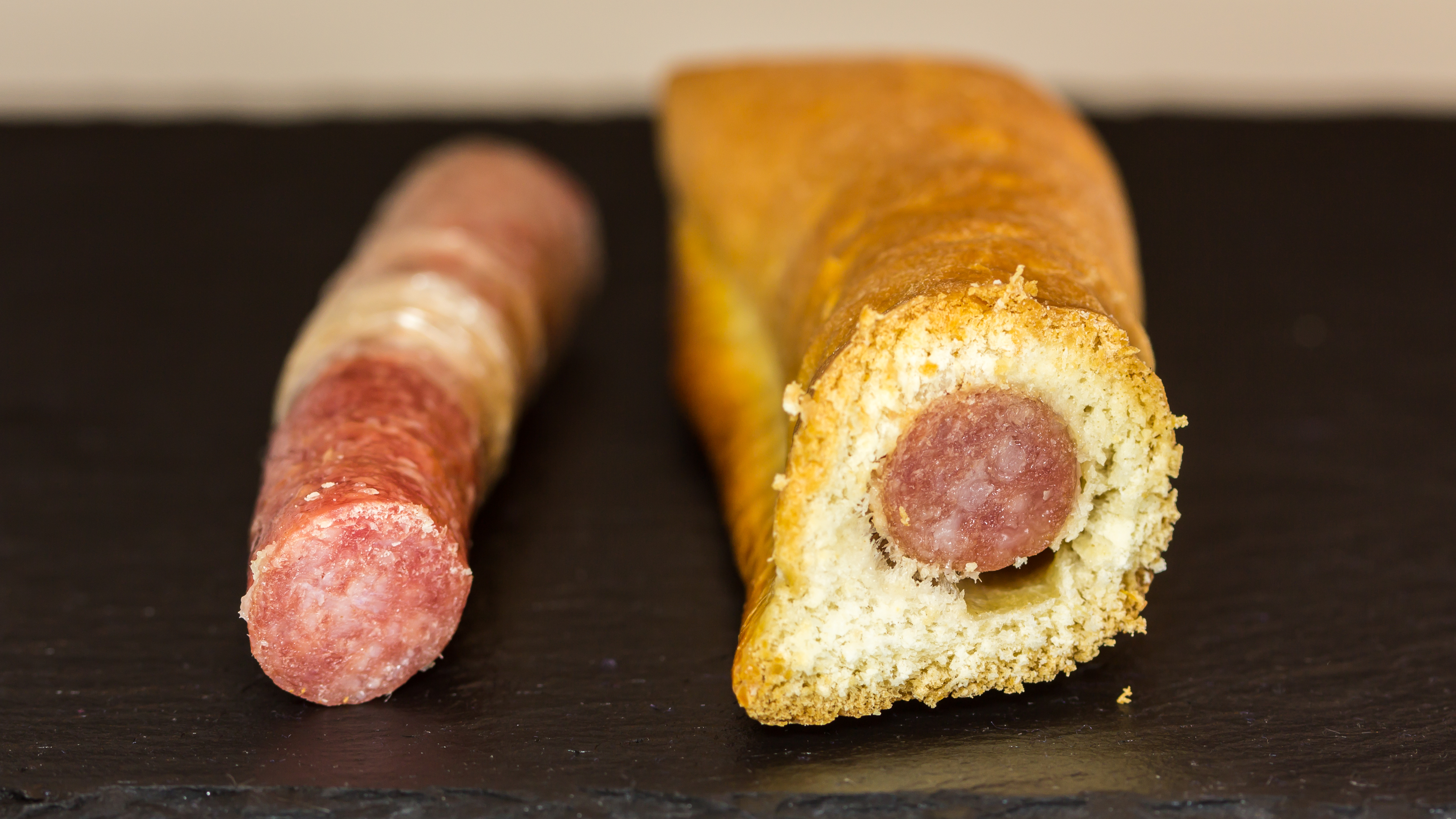
- BiFi and BiFi Roll
- Industry: Food industry
- Founded: 1972; 53 years ago
- Area served: Germany, Switzerland, Austria, Belgium, the Netherlands, Denmark, Sweden, France, Norway, Finland and the United Kingdom
- Products: Salami snacks
- Parent: Jack Link's
- Website: bifi.com

BiFi is a brand of meat snacks owned by the American snack company Jack Link's. BiFi Roll (introduced in 1987) and BiFi Carazza (introduced in 1994) are the most popular BiFi products besides BiFi Original. Up to this day, the meat snacks are still manufactured in the original facilities of "Schafft Fleischwerke" in Ansbach, Germany.

== History ==
The brand BiFi was introduced in 1972. Originally, the name BiFi was only used for the first product of today's product range, a small salami. The name BiFi derived from the English adjective "beefy" (meaty). Currently more than ten products are distributed under the brand.

After "Schafft Fleischwerke" became part of the "Union Deutsche Lebensmittelwerke GmbH" (Union of German Food factories Ltd.), BiFi was included in the Unilever product range.

In February 2014, Unilever sold their meat snacks brands BiFi and Peperami to the largest meat snack producer worldwide, Jack Link's.

In 2017, the brand's logo and packaging design was revised. The new look of the brand was introduced in the context by a large-scale TV and online campaign under the claim "It's right when it feels right".

== See also ==
- Peperami (a similar snack also made by Jack Link's)
