= Peperami =

British pork jerky snack

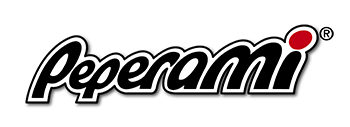
- Product type: Meat
- Country: Germany
- Introduced: 1979; 47 years ago
- Related brands: BiFi, Jack Link's Beef Jerky
- Markets: United Kingdom; Ireland; Mexico

Peperami is a pork jerky snack manufactured by Jack Link's. It is manufactured in Ansbach, Germany, and sold in the United Kingdom, Mexico and Ireland, across multiples and independent retailers.

The snack has multiple variants made with pork, and Peperami launched a beef variant in 2017. A Peperami and Cheese Snack Box was added to the range in November 2018 and Peperami also launched a chicken variant called "Pep'd up Chicken Bites" in April 2019.

== History ==
Peperami was introduced in 1979 and was previously owned by Unilever within their larger global meat snacking portfolio. Citing a struggle to make meat-snacking fit within its global portfolio, Unilever announced on 21 February 2014 that it had signed a definitive agreement for the sale of its meat snacks business to Jack Link's, for an undisclosed amount. The sale included the brands BiFi, sold in Germany, and Peperami, which retails in the UK, Mexico and Ireland.

== Product portfolio ==
| Product | Varieties |
|---|---|
| Original | Minis; Singles; 6 pack; Bunch of 5's; Snack Pack |
| Hot | Singles; 5 pack |
| Firestick | Singles; 5 pack |
| Tex Mex | Singles; 5 pack; Snack Pack |
| Beef | Singles; 3 pack |
| Peperami & Cheese Snack Box | 50 g Snack Box |
| Chorizo | Singles; 5 pack |
| Chicken Bites | Singles; 4 pack |

== Animal ==
The Peperami "Animal" has been the face of the Peperami brand since the early 1990s. The anthropomorphised sausage stick was created by Lowe and introduced in a 1993 television advertisement, accompanied by the strapline “Peperami, it’s a bit of an animal” (or some variation thereof). In 1996 a point and click PC-game called Animal was released.

Originally voiced by comedian Adrian Edmondson and animated in stop motion (by Loose Moose Productions in early 90s), the mascot was a continual presence in advertising between 1993 and 2014. The ‘Animal’ mascot returned to television campaigns in 2015 in CGI form.

In 2017, a new version of the Animal character – Beef – was introduced to announce the arrival of a new beef variation of Peperami. Beef Animal first appeared in media in 2018. When the Chicken Bites were introduced, a Chicken Animal was introduced as well.

== Advertising ==
In recent years Peperami has run a number of campaigns and partnerships to relaunch Animal. These have included a 2016 partnership with the Angry Birds film and a 2018 promotional partnership with Merlin Entertainment, specifically their Thorpe Park and Alton Towers theme parks. In addition, the brand has launched several stunts to create media pick up around the mascot – both pork and beef.

Most recently in 2018, Peperami have launched a media campaign with the tag line ‘Brothers From Another Mother’ promoting Original and Beef Animals. This is the first time the two Animals have been placed together within environmental or TV media.

== Meat content ==
In 2003, in an effort to retain appeal with a more health-conscious market, Unilever worked to revise the Peperami formula to produce a product with a reduction in fat, saturated fat and salt content.

== See also ==
- BiFi (a similar snack also made by Jack Link's)
