= Chocolate-covered bacon =

American dish

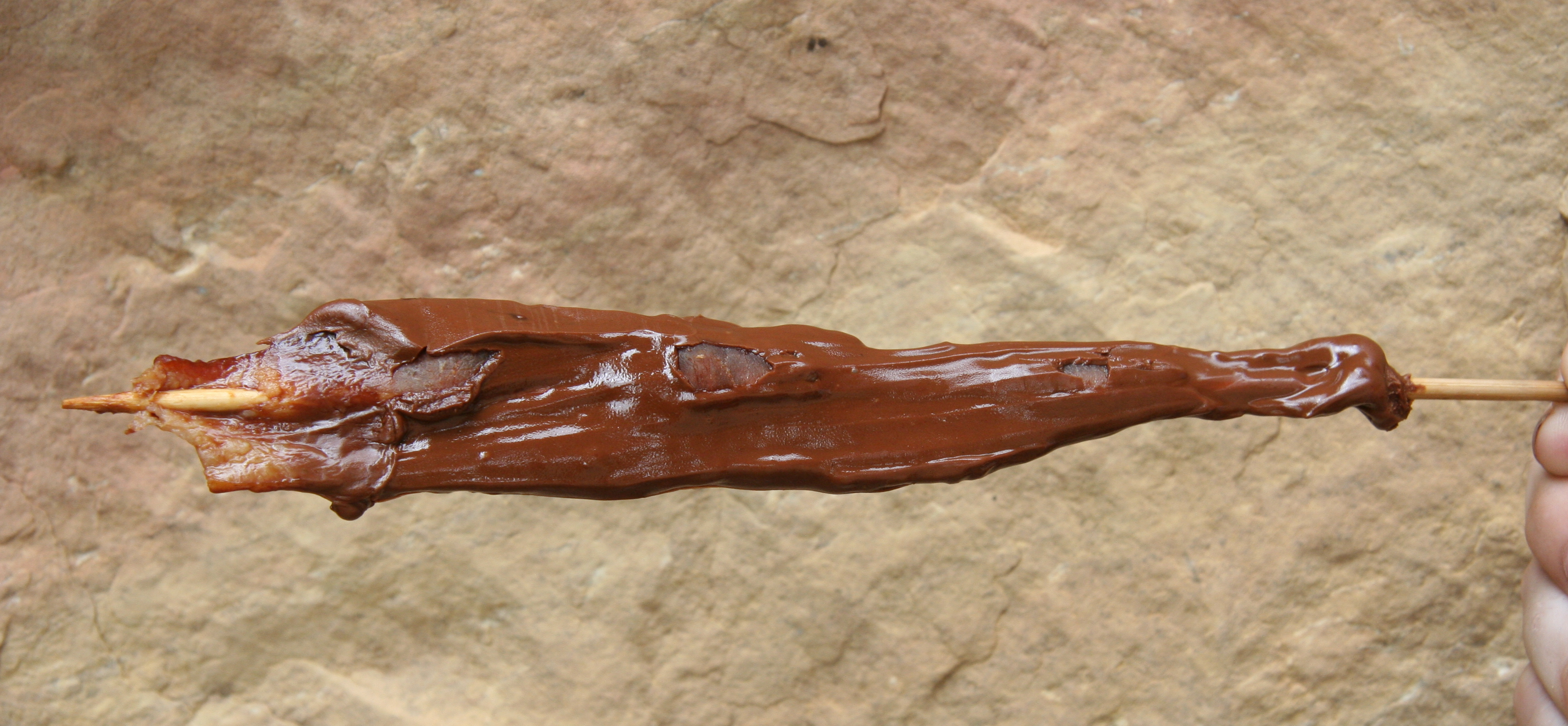
- Chocolate-covered bacon on a stick
- Place of origin: North America
- Main ingredients: Pork belly, chocolate
- Food energy (per serving): 638 (440 from fat; serving size 132 g)
- Other information: Cholesterol 53 mg, sodium 632 mg, potassium 347 mg, carbohydrate 37.7 g, protein 11.3 g

Chocolate-covered bacon is an American food that consists of cooked bacon with a coating of either milk chocolate or dark chocolate. It can be topped with sea salt, crumbled pistachios, walnuts, or almond bits. References on the internet date back at least to 2005. The popularity of the dish has spread worldwide, and the dish has featured on television shows about food. A variant has been served at state fairs, where the bacon is served with chocolate sauce for dipping, and the dish has been developed into a gourmet food bar.

A similar food, called "Chocolate salo" originated in Ukraine. Candy manufacturer Confectionery Factory made an April Fool's Day version of the treat out of caramel and some rendered pork fat, giving a candy with a salty flavor similar to salo in chocolate.

== Reception ==
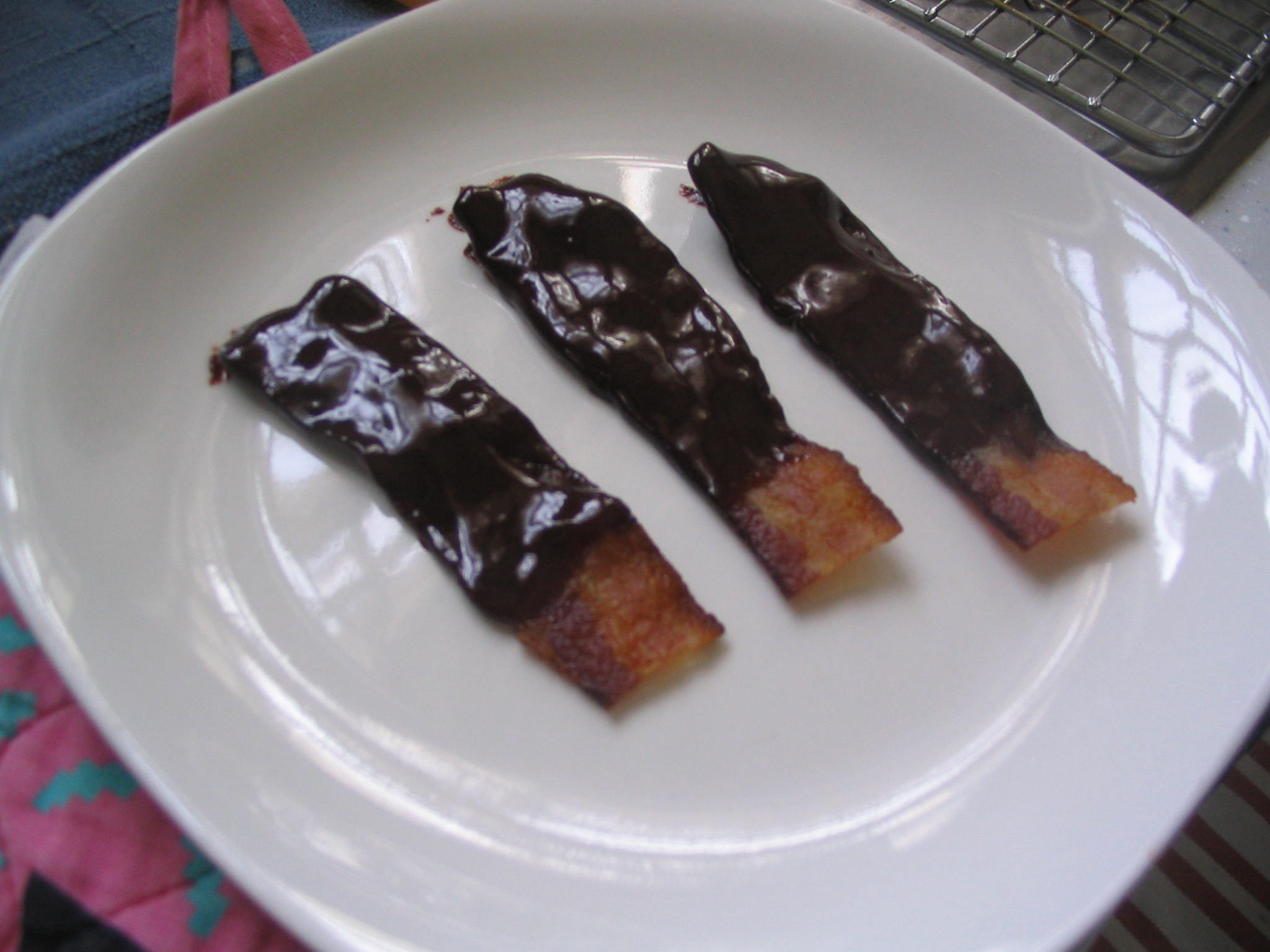
Bacon dipped in chocolate ganache

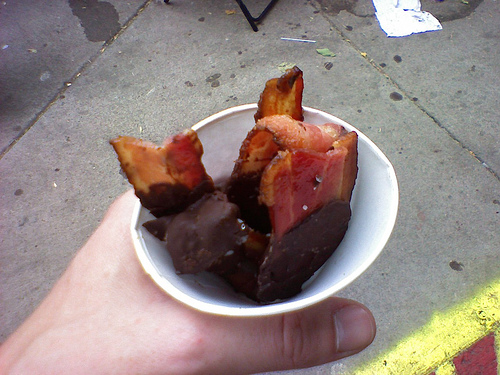
Bacon dipped in chocolate from the 2008 Minnesota State Fair

Chocolate-covered bacon is sold as a specialty food across the United States. It appeared at the Minnesota State Fair under the name "Pig Lickers"; it is sold at the Santa Cruz Boardwalk in California and under the name "Pig Candy" by a chocolate maker in New York City.

The dish has appeared on the television show Dinner: Impossible as one of the foods served by chef Michael Symon as part of his "mission" to turn everyday boardwalk foods into a gourmet meal at the boardwalk in Wildwood, New Jersey.

Bacon was served with a chocolate dipping sauce at the 2009 Florida State Fair. Time magazine videotaped the making of a bacon bar.

== Preparation and variations ==
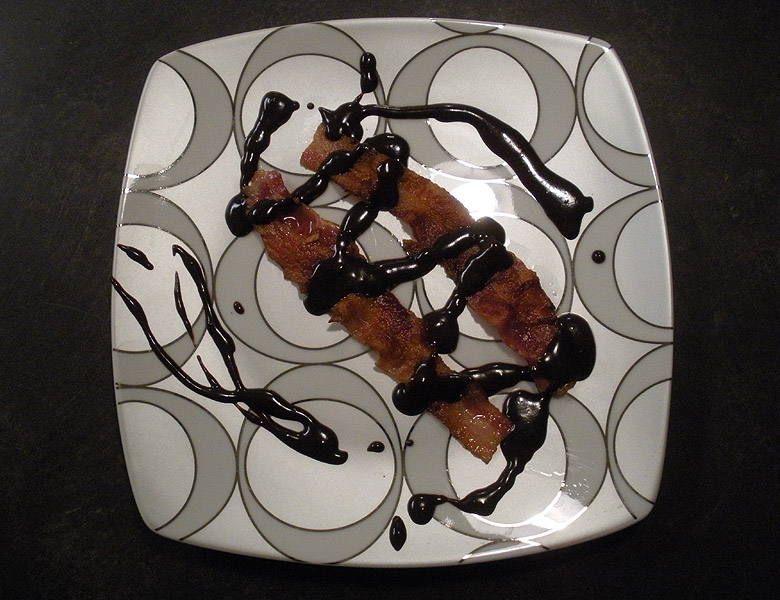
A melted chocolate bar drizzled over bacon

Typically, streaky bacon is used to make chocolate-covered bacon, although other cuts may be used. It is first cooked and then immersed in melted chocolate; toppings (if any) are added, and the dish is allowed to cool. A variation is to dip the bacon in melted chocolate for a partial coating, leaving some of the bacon showing.

The popularity in the United States of bacon combined with sweet ingredients, caused by the quick (and sometimes viral) spreading of recipes in national media and on the Internet, has led to unexpected culinary inventions, such as candied bacon cubes, which are based on a recipe for "Candied bacon with whipped cream" printed in The New York Times, and bacon strips baked with brown sugar used as garnish for martinis.

== See also ==
- Bacon mania
- Chicken fried bacon
- Bacon explosion
- List of chocolate-covered foods
- 2010s in food
