= Bacon =

Type of salt-cured pork

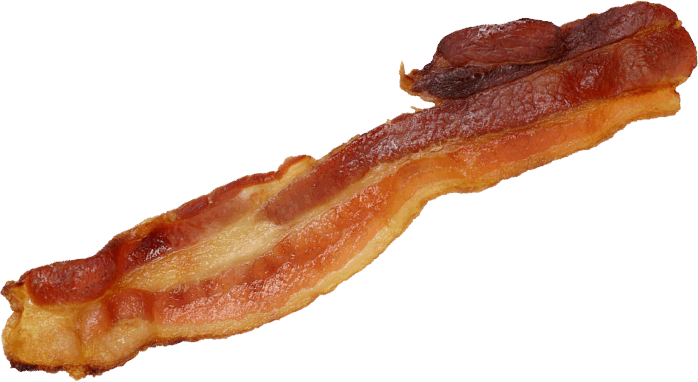
- A strip of cooked side (streaky) bacon
- Type: Cured pork
- Main ingredients: Salt-cured pork belly

Bacon is a type of salt-cured pork made from various cuts, typically the belly or less fatty parts of the back. It is eaten as a side dish (particularly in breakfasts), used as a central ingredient (e.g., the BLT sandwich), or as a flavouring or accent.

Bacon is also used for barding and larding roasts, especially game, including venison and pheasant, and may also be used to insulate or flavour roast joints by being layered onto the meat. The word is derived from the Proto-Germanic *bakkon, meaning 'back meat'.

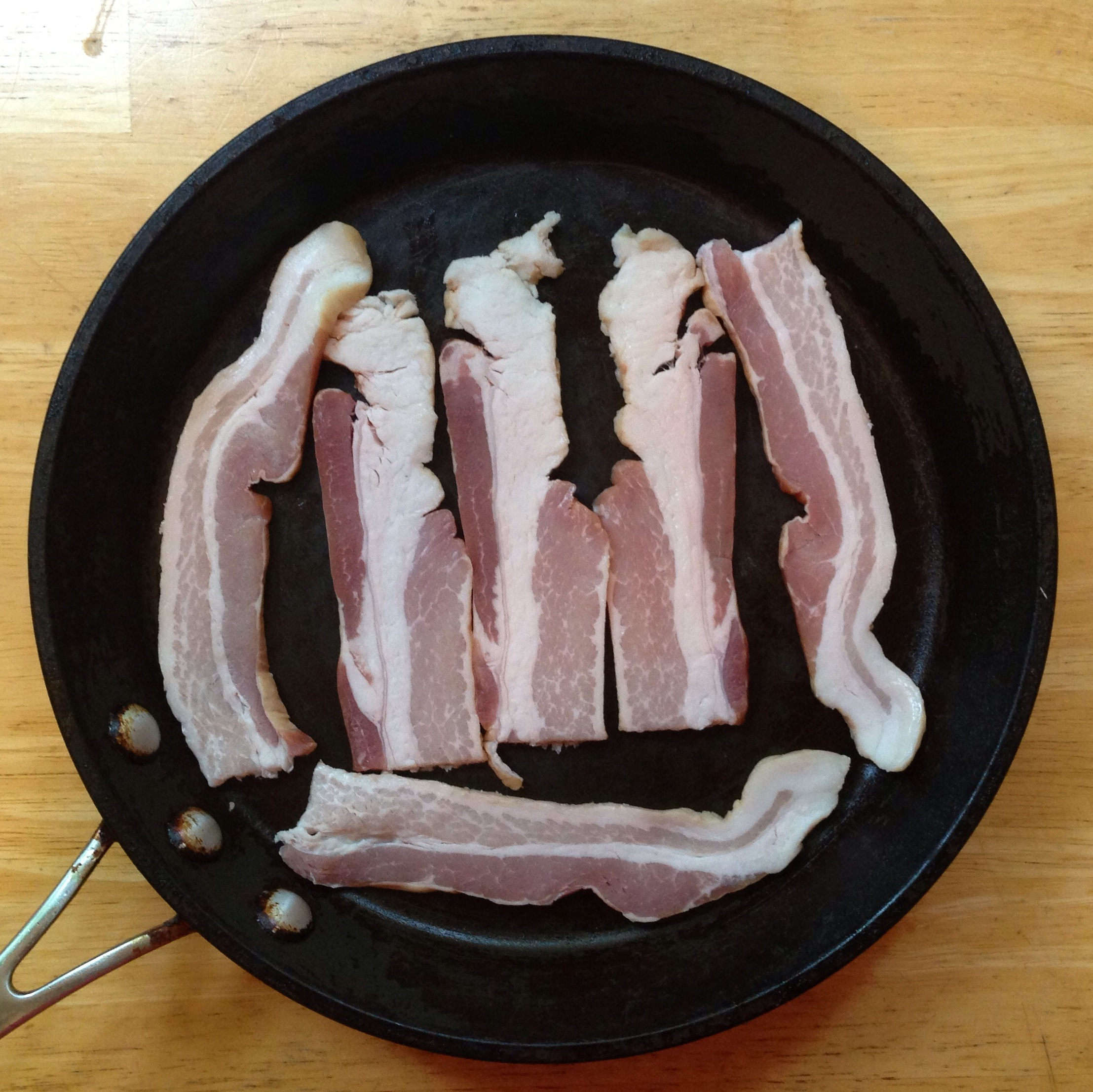
Uncooked cured and smoked side bacon

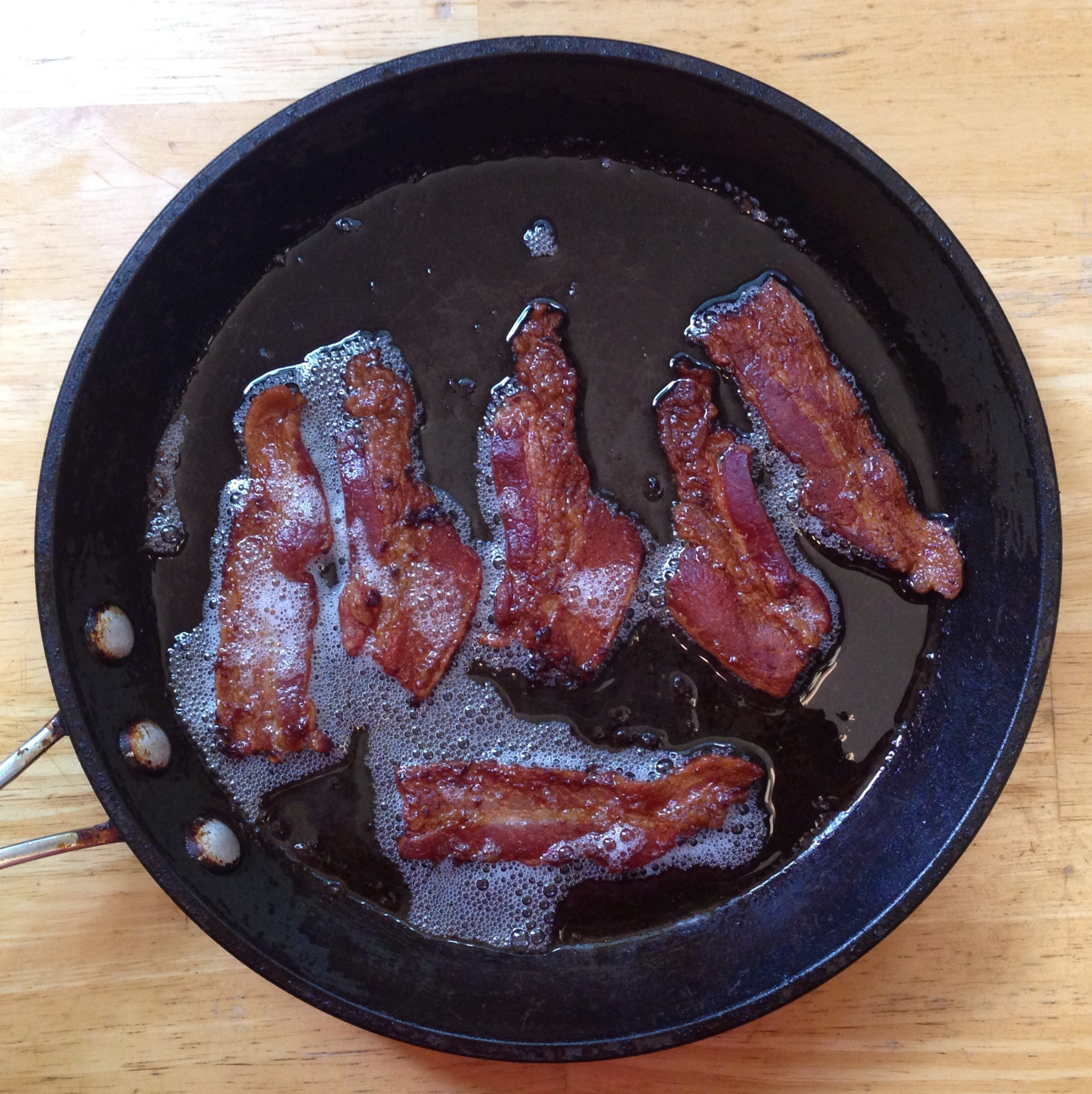
After being pan-fried

Meat from other animals, such as beef, lamb, chicken, goat, or turkey, may also be cut, cured, or otherwise prepared to resemble bacon, and may even be referred to as, for example, "turkey bacon". Such use is common in areas with significant Jewish and Muslim populations as both religions prohibit the consumption of pork. Vegetarian bacons such as "soy bacon" also exist.

== Curing and smoking ==
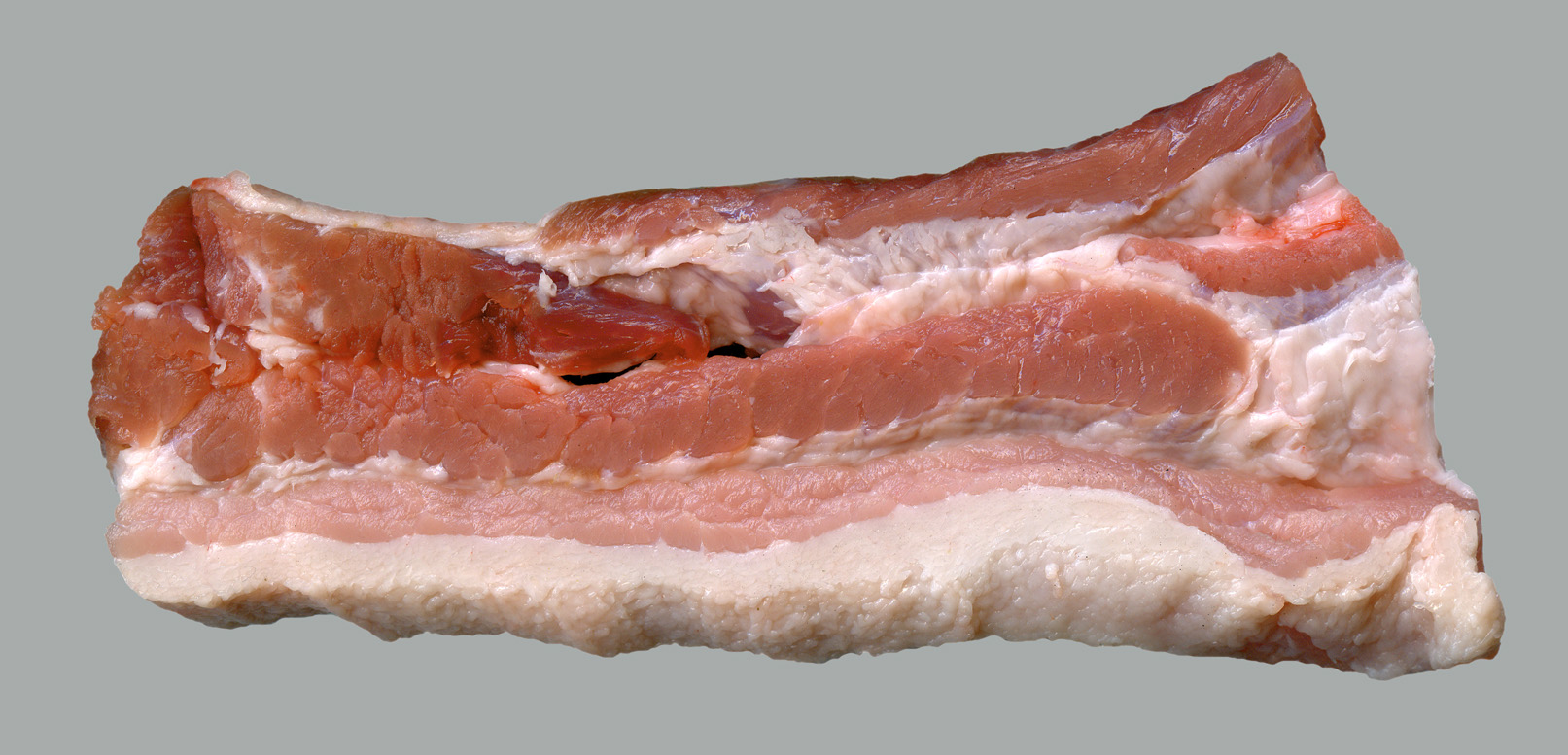
Uncured pork belly

Before the advent of cheap and widespread artificial refrigeration in the modern era, the curing of meat was necessary for its safe long-term preservation. However, both the flavour imparted to the meat in doing so and the extended shelf life it offered had become much prized, and although curing is in general no longer necessary in the developed world, it continues in wide use.

Bacon is cured through either a process of injecting it with or soaking it in brine, known as wet curing, or rubbed with salt, known as dry curing. Bacon brine has added curing ingredients, most notably nitrites or nitrates, which speed the curing and stabilise colour. Cured bacon may then be dried for weeks or months in cold air, or it may be smoked or boiled. Fresh and dried bacon are typically cooked before eating, often by pan frying. Boiled bacon is ready-to-eat, as is some smoked bacon, but they may be cooked further before eating. Differing flavours can be achieved by using various types of wood, or less common fuels such as corn cobs or peat. This process can take up to eighteen hours, depending on the intensity of the flavour desired. The Virginia Housewife (1824), thought to be one of the earliest American cookbooks, gives no indication that bacon is ever not smoked, though it gives no advice on flavouring, noting only that care should be taken lest the fire get too hot.

Bacon is distinguished from other salt-cured pork by differences in the cuts of meat used and in the brine or dry packing. Historically, the terms ham and bacon referred to different cuts of meat that were brined or packed identically, often together in the same barrel. Today, ham is defined as coming from the hind portion of the pig and brine specifically for curing ham includes a greater amount of sugar, while bacon is less sweet, though ingredients such as brown sugar or maple syrup are used for flavour. Bacon is similar to salt pork, which in modern times is often prepared from similar cuts, but salt pork is never smoked, and has a much higher salt content.

For safety, bacon may be treated to prevent trichinosis, caused by Trichinella, a parasitic roundworm which can be destroyed by heating, freezing, drying, or smoking. Sodium polyphosphates, such as sodium triphosphate, may also be added to make the product easier to slice and to reduce spattering when the bacon is pan-fried.

== Cuts ==
Bacon type differs depending on the primal cut of pork from which it is prepared, which reflects local preference.

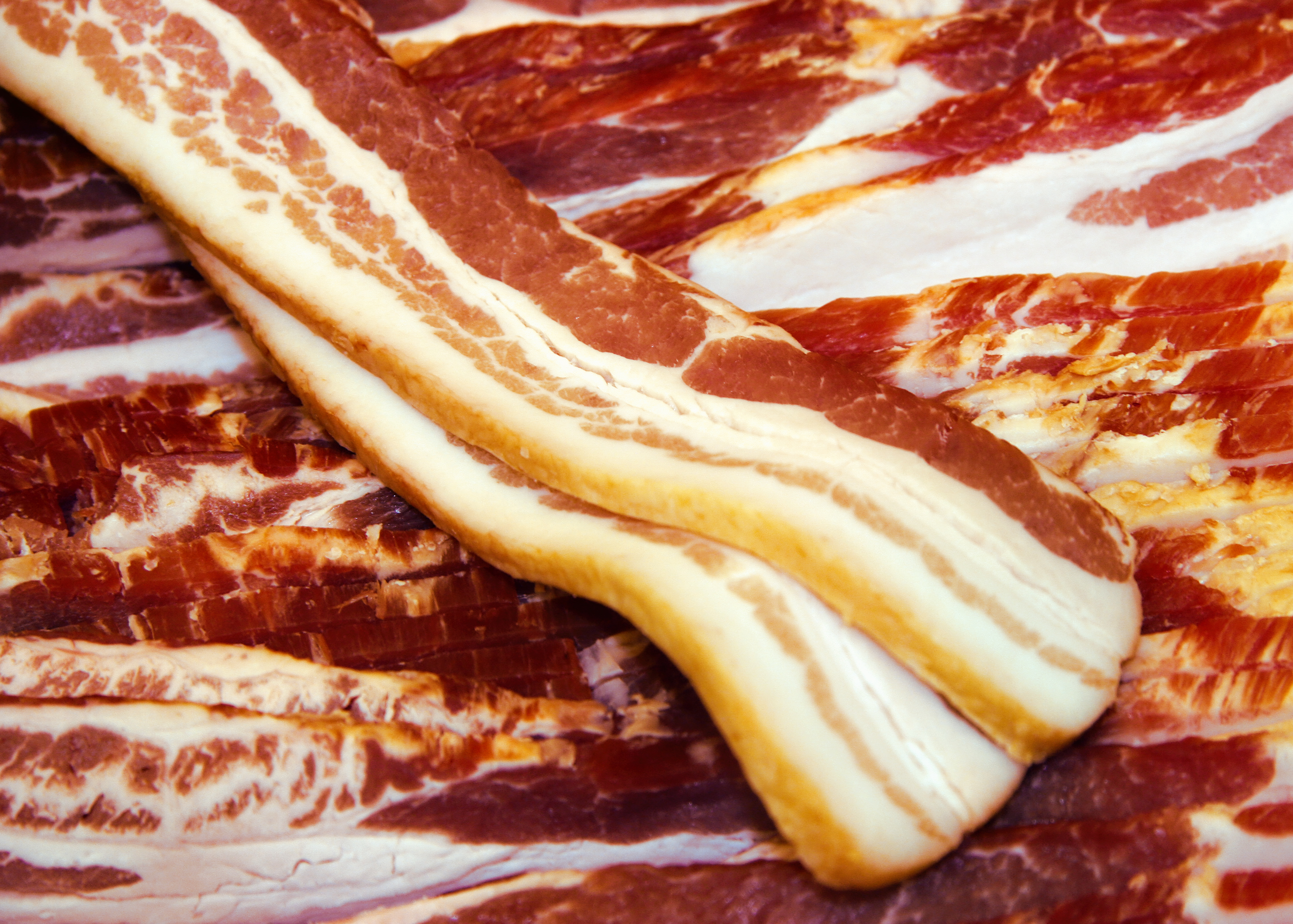
Uncooked strips of side bacon

- Side bacon, sometimes known as "streaky bacon", comes from the pork belly. It has long alternating layers of fat and muscle running parallel to the rind. This is the most common form of bacon in the United States.
  - Pancetta is an Italian form of side bacon, sold smoked or unsmoked (aqua). It is generally rolled up into cylinders after curing. Pancetta is known for having a strong flavour, and is often used as an ingredient in pasta dishes such as carbonara.

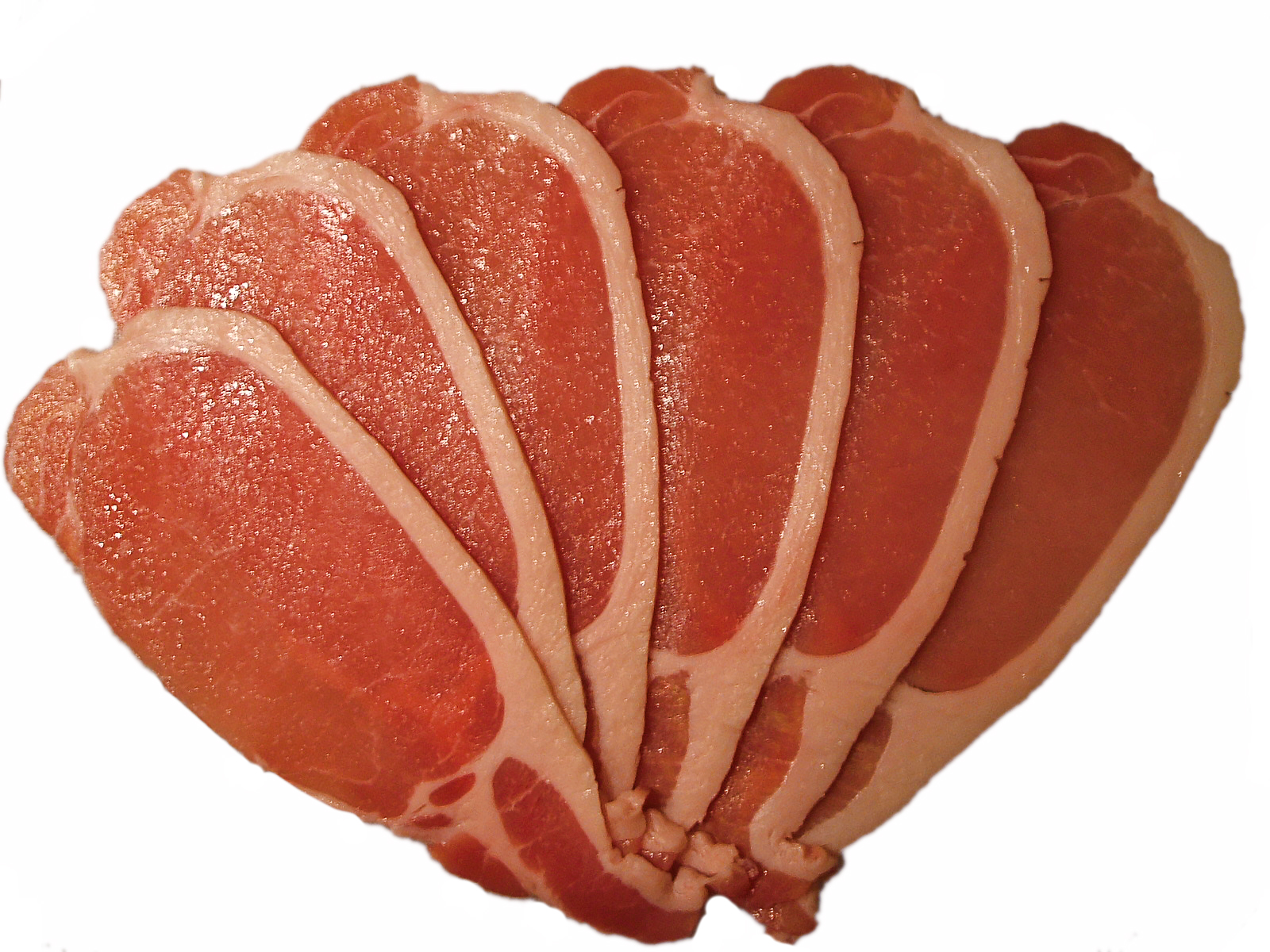
Uncooked back bacon

- Back bacon contains meat from the loin and belly in the middle of the pig. It is a leaner cut, with less fat compared to side bacon. Most bacon consumed in the United Kingdom and Ireland is back bacon.
- Collar bacon is taken from the back of a pig near the head.
- Cottage bacon is made from the lean meat from a boneless pork shoulder that is typically tied into an oval shape.

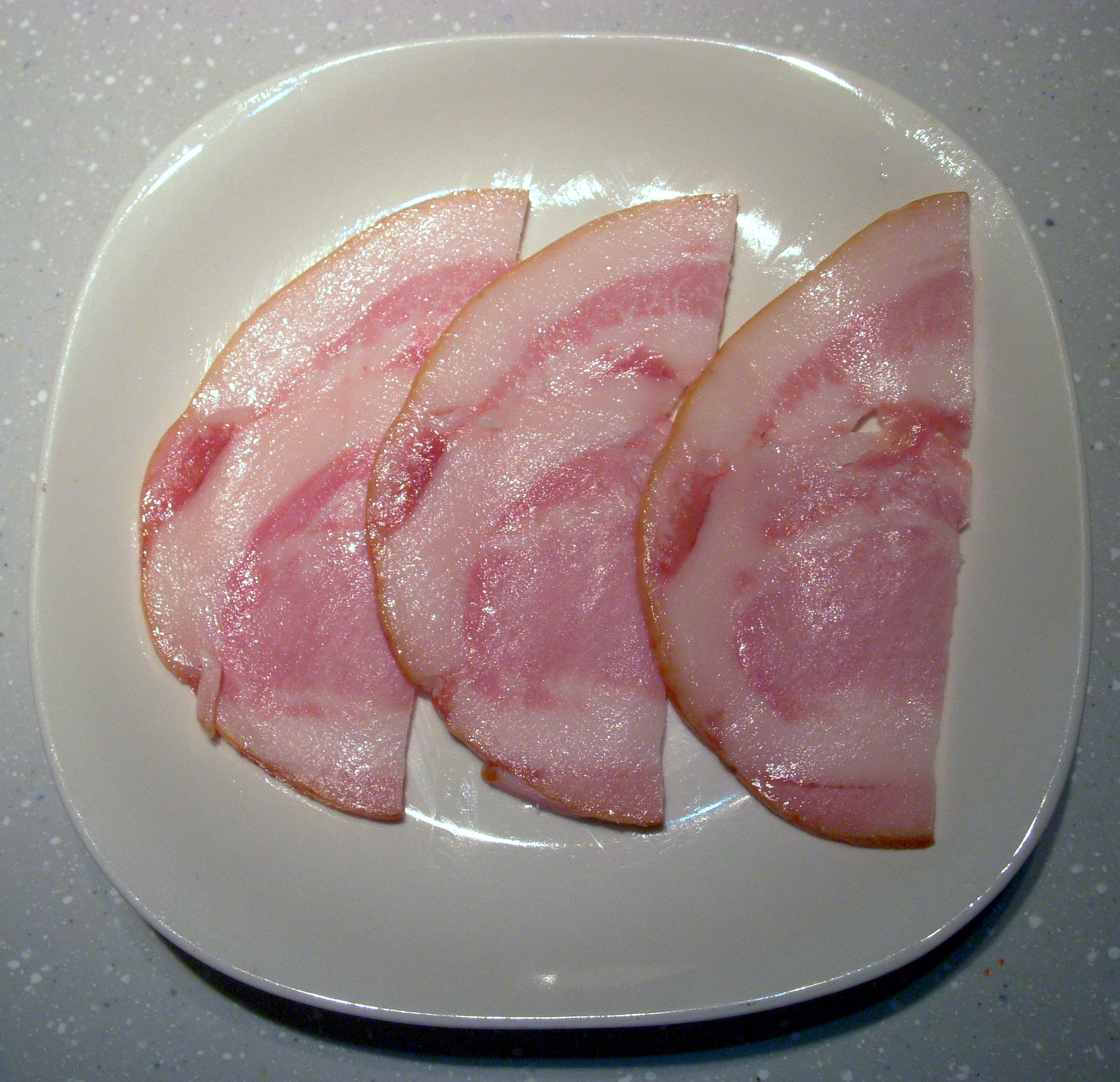
Sliced jowl bacon

- Jowl bacon is cured and smoked cheeks of pork. Guanciale is an Italian jowl bacon that is seasoned and dry cured but not smoked.

The inclusion of skin with a cut of bacon, known as the "bacon rind", varies, though is less common in the English-speaking world.

== Around the world ==
=== Australia and New Zealand ===
The most common form sold is middle bacon, which includes some of the streaky, fatty section of side bacon along with a portion of the loin of back bacon. In response to increasing consumer diet-consciousness, some supermarkets also offer the loin section only. This is sold as short cut bacon and is usually priced slightly higher than middle bacon. Both varieties are usually available with the rind removed.

=== Canada ===
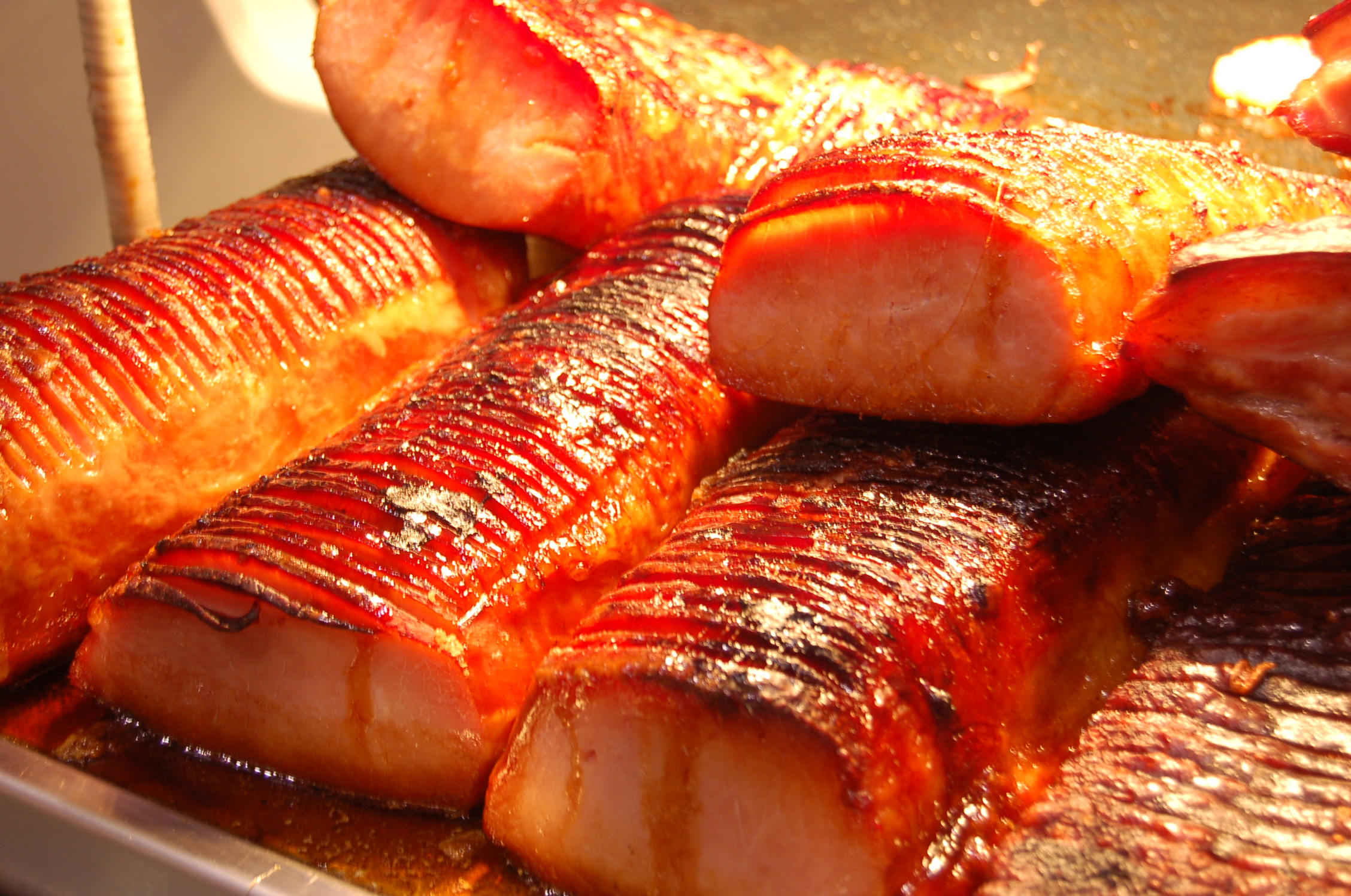
Roasted peameal bacon with a maple glaze at the St. Lawrence Market in Toronto, Ontario, Canada

In Canada, the term bacon on its own typically refers to side bacon. Canadian-style back bacon is a lean cut from the eye of the pork loin with little surrounding fat. Peameal bacon is an unsmoked back bacon, wet-cured and coated in fine-ground cornmeal (historically, it was rolled in ground, dried peas); it is popular in southern Ontario. Bacon is often eaten in breakfasts, such as with cooked eggs or pancakes. Maple syrup is often used as a flavouring while curing bacon in Canada.

=== Germany ===
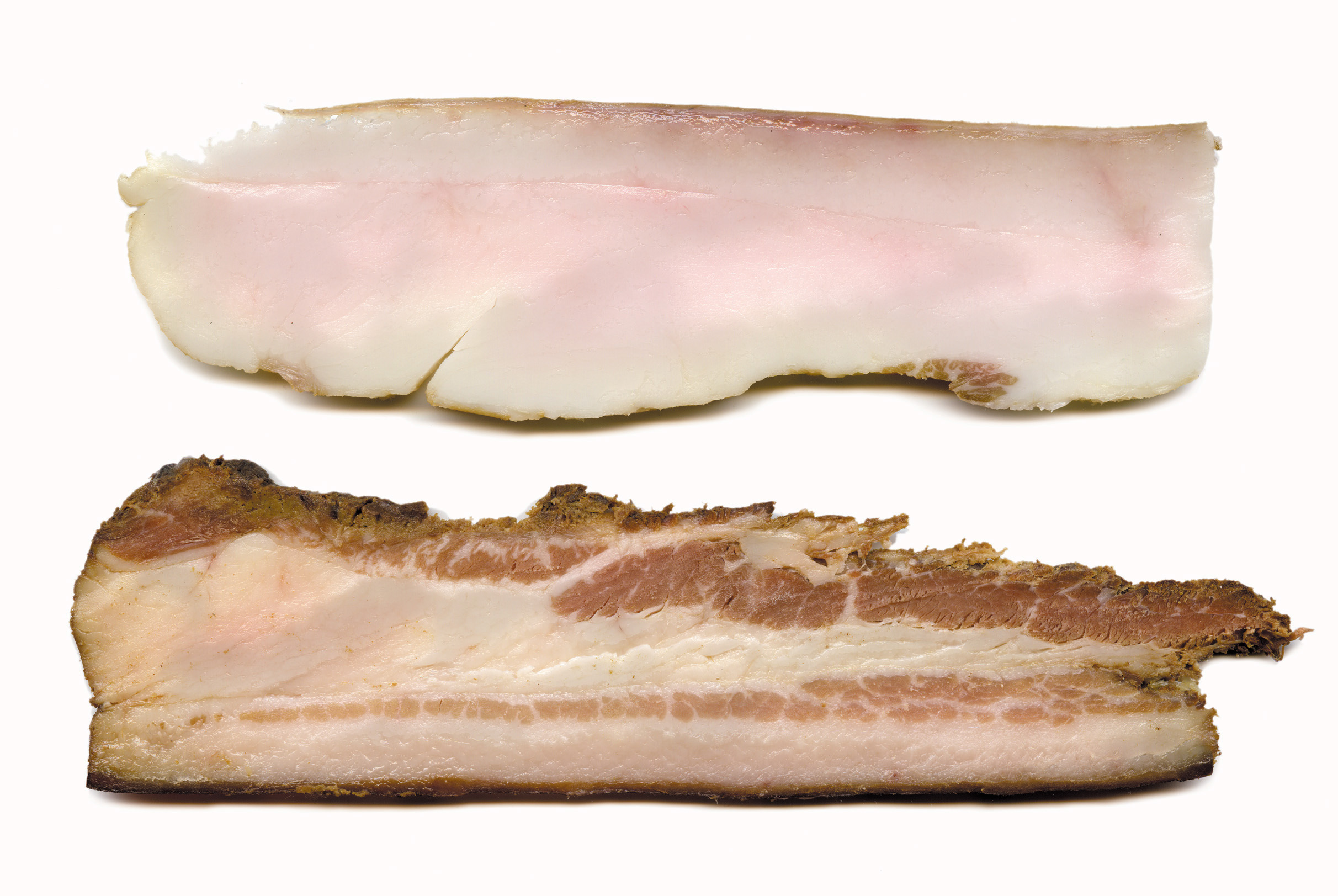
German Speck, a salted, smoked, and roasted pork fatback or belly cut used as a cold cut

Some of the meanings of bacon overlap with the German-language term Speck. Germans use the term bacon explicitly for Frühstücksspeck ('breakfast Speck') which are cured or smoked pork slices. Traditional German cold cuts favour ham over bacon; however, Wammerl (grilled pork belly) remains popular in Bavaria.

Small bacon cubes (called Grieben or Grammerln in Austria and southern Germany) have been a rather important ingredient of various southern German dishes. They are used for adding flavour to soups and salads and for Speck dumplings and various noodle and potato dishes. Instead of preparing them at home from larger slices, they have been sold ready made as convenience foods recently as Baconwürfel ("bacon cubes") in German retail stores.

=== Japan ===
In Japan, bacon (ベーコン) is pronounced bēkon. It is cured and smoked belly meat as in the US, and is sold in either regular or half-length sizes. Bacon in Japan is different from that in the US in that the meat is not sold raw, but is processed, precooked and has a ham-like consistency when cooked. Uncured, sliced pork belly, known as bara (バラ), is very popular in Japan and is used in a variety of dishes (e.g. yakitori and yakiniku).

=== Great Britain and Ireland ===
Back bacon is the most common form in Great Britain and Ireland, and is the usual meaning of the plain term bacon. A thin slice of bacon is known as a rasher; about 70% of bacon is sold as rashers. Heavily trimmed back cuts which consist of just the eye of meat, known as a medallion, are also available. All types may be unsmoked or smoked. The side cut normal in America is known as "streaky bacon", and there is also a long cut, curving round on itself, known as "middle bacon", which is back bacon at one end, and streaky at the other, as well as less common cuts. Bacon is also sold and served as joints, usually boiled, broiled or roast, or in thicker slices called chops or steaks. These are usually eaten as part of other meals.

Bacon may be cured in several ways, and may be smoked or unsmoked; unsmoked bacon is known as "green bacon". Fried or grilled bacon rashers are included in the "traditional" full breakfast. Hot bacon sandwiches are a popular cafe dish throughout the United Kingdom and the Republic of Ireland, and are anecdotally recommended as a hangover cure.

Bacon is often served with eggs and sausages as part of a full English breakfast.

=== United States ===
The term bacon on its own generally refers to side bacon, which is the most popular type of bacon sold in the US. Back bacon is known as "Canadian bacon" or "Canadian-style bacon", and is usually sold pre-cooked and thick-sliced. American bacons include varieties smoked with hickory, mesquite or applewood and flavourings such as maple, brown sugar, honey, or molasses. A side of unsliced bacon is known as "slab bacon".

USDA regulations only recognise bacon as "cured" if it has been treated with synthetic nitrites or nitrates (e.g. sodium nitrate or potassium nitrate). This means that bacon cured with nitrites derived from celery or beets (which has the same chemical outcome) must be labelled "uncured" and include a notice such as "no nitrates or nitrites added except for that naturally occurring in celery". There is also bacon for sale uncured with any nitrites from any sources.

== History ==
In Middle English the term bacon or bacoun referred to all pork in general. Before the Industrial Revolution, bacon was generally produced on local farms and in domestic kitchens. In the 1770s, John Harris opened the world's first commercial bacon processing plant in Calne, Wiltshire.

== Bacon mania ==
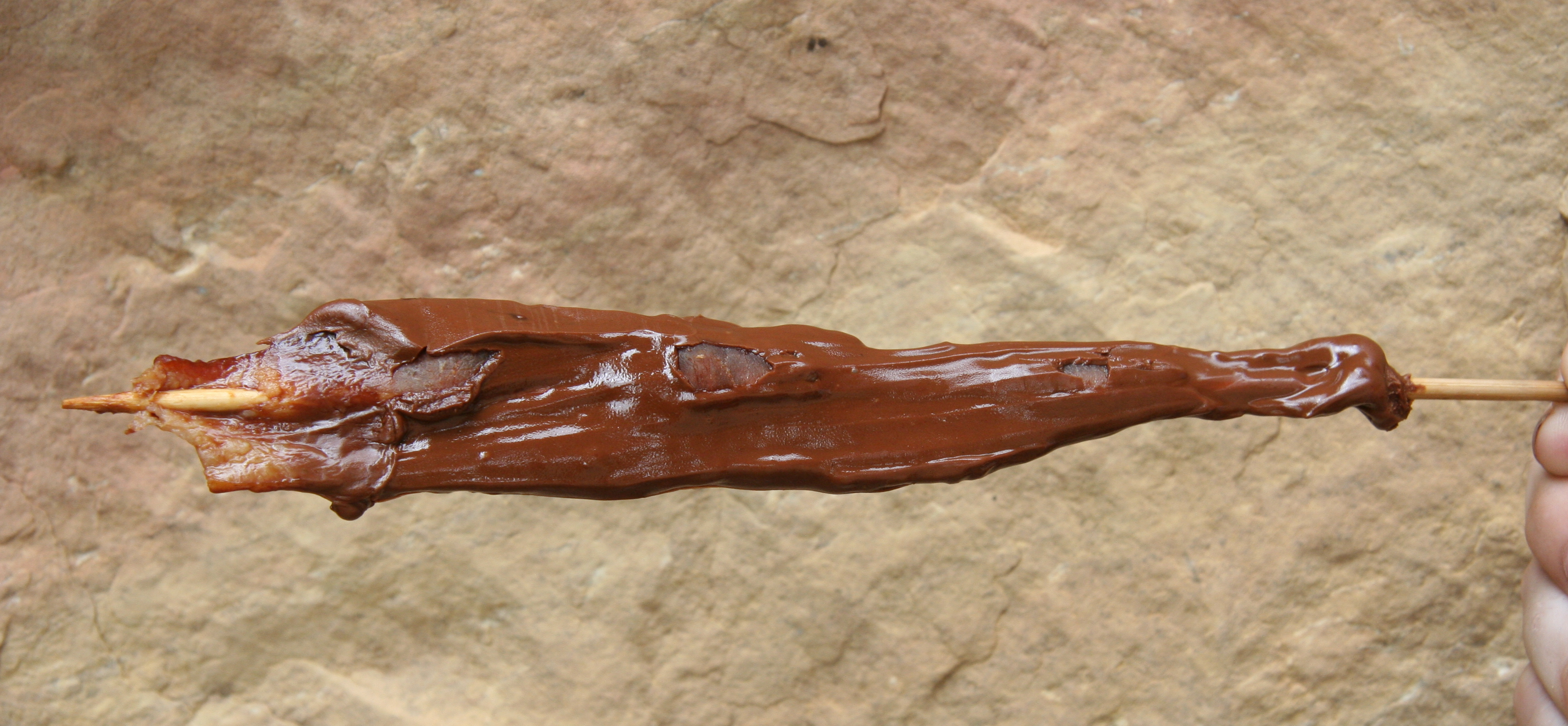
Chocolate-covered bacon on a stick

The United States and Canada have seen an increase in the popularity of bacon and bacon-related recipes, dubbed "bacon mania". The sale of bacon in the US has increased significantly since 2011. Sales climbed 9.5% in 2013, making it an all-time high of nearly $4 billion in US. In a survey conducted by Smithfield, 65% of Americans would support bacon as their "national food". Dishes such as bacon explosion, chicken fried bacon, and chocolate-covered bacon have been popularised over the Internet, as has the use of candied bacon. Recipes spread quickly through both countries' national media, culinary blogs, and YouTube. Celebrity chef Bobby Flay has endorsed a "Bacon of the Month" club online, in print, and on national television. Everything Tastes Better with Bacon, a 2002 book by Sara Perry, is a cookbook in which all dishes contain bacon.

Commentators explain this surging interest in bacon by reference to what they deem American cultural characteristics. Sarah Hepola, in a 2008 article in Salon.com, suggests a number of reasons, one of them being that eating bacon in the modern, health-conscious world is an act of rebellion: "Loving bacon is like shoving a middle finger in the face of all that is healthy and holy while an unfiltered cigarette smoulders between your lips." She also suggests bacon is sexy (with a reference to Sarah Katherine Lewis' book Sex and Bacon), kitsch, and funny. Hepola concludes by saying "bacon is America".

Alison Cook, writing in the Houston Chronicle, argues the case of bacon's American citizenship by referring to historical and geographical uses of bacon. Early American literature echoes the sentiment—in Ebenezer Cooke's 1708 poem The Sot-Weed Factor, a satire of life in early colonial America, the narrator already complains that practically all the food in America was bacon-infused.

As of December 2016, the U.S. national frozen pork belly inventory totaled 17.8 million lb (8.1 million kg), the lowest level in 50 years.

== Bacon dishes ==
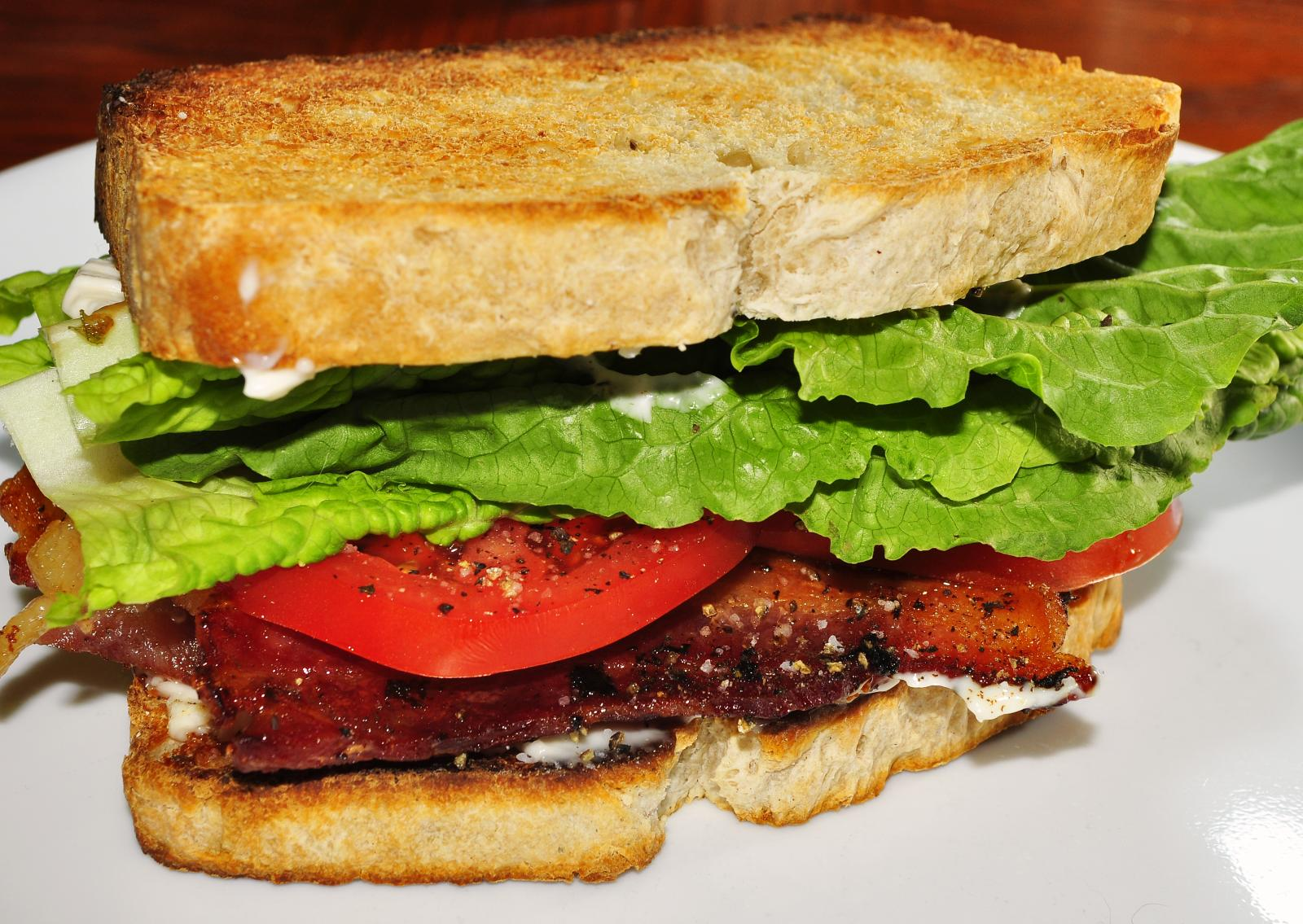
A bacon, lettuce, and tomato (BLT) sandwich

Bacon dishes include bacon and egg pie, bacon, lettuce, and tomato (BLT) sandwiches, Cobb salad, and various bacon-wrapped foods, such as scallops, shrimp, and asparagus. Recently invented bacon dishes include chicken fried bacon, chocolate covered bacon, bacon jerky, bacon ice cream and the bacon explosion. Tatws Pum Munud is a traditional Welsh stew, made with sliced potatoes, vegetables and smoked bacon. Bacon jam and bacon marmalade are also commercially available.

Streaky bacon is more commonly used as a topping in the US on such items as pizza, salads, sandwiches, hamburgers, baked potatoes, hot dogs, and soups. In the US, sliced smoked back bacon is used less frequently than the streaky variety, but can sometimes be found on pizza, salads, and omelettes.

Bacon is also used as an accent in dishes, such as bacon-topped meatloaf, sautéed crisp and crumbled into green beans, or as a crumble in a salad.

Bacon bits are crumbled bacon in condiment form, typically commercially prepared and preserved for long shelf life.

== Bacon fat ==
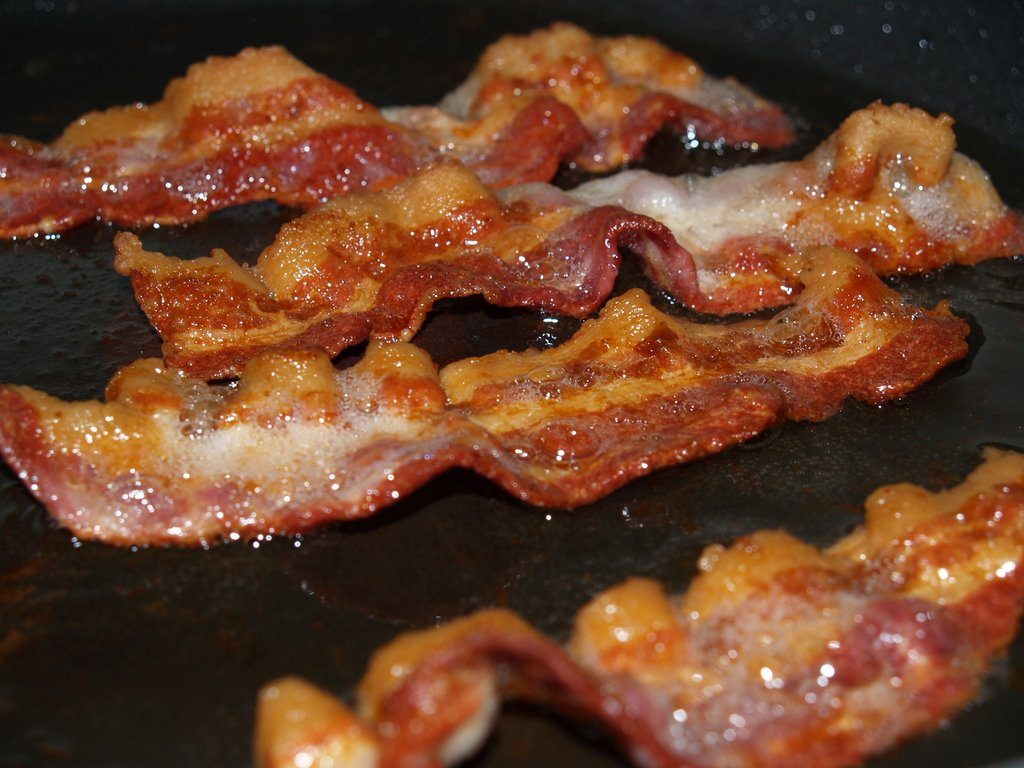
Bacon frying in its own grease

Bacon fat liquefies and becomes drippings when it is heated. Once cool, it firms into a form of lard. Bacon fat is flavourful and is used for various cooking purposes. Traditionally, bacon grease is saved in British and southern US cuisine, and used as a base for cooking and as an all-purpose flavouring, for everything from gravy to cornbread to salad dressing.

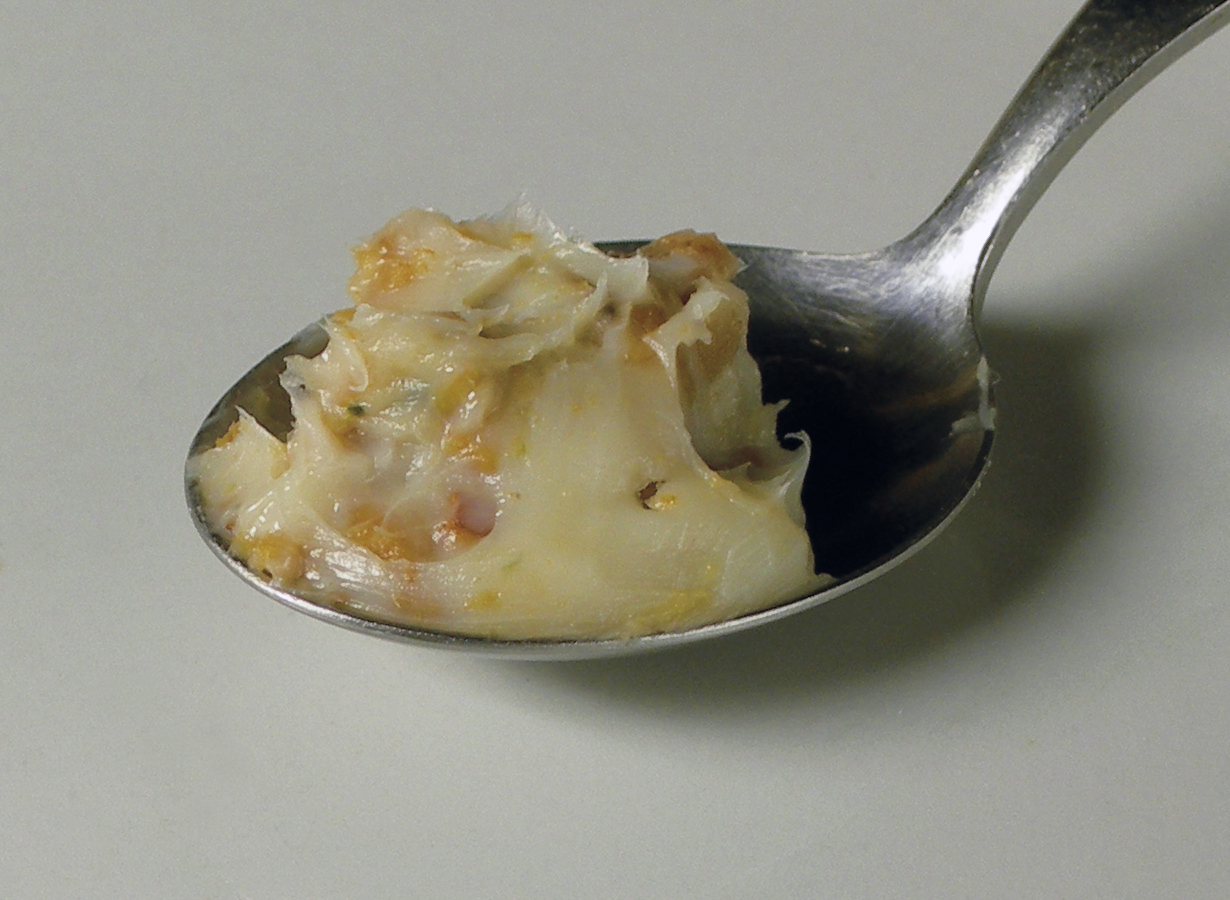
German Griebenschmalz used as spread

In Germany, Griebenschmalz is a popular spread made from bacon lard.

Bacon is often used for a cooking technique called barding consisting of laying or wrapping strips of bacon or other fats over a roast to provide additional fat to a lean piece of meat. It is often used for roast game birds, and is a traditional method of preparing beef filet mignon, which is wrapped in strips of bacon before cooking. The bacon itself may afterwards be discarded or served to eat, like cracklings. It may also be cut into lardons.

One teaspoon (4 g or 0.14 oz) of bacon grease has 38 calories (40 kJ/g). It is composed almost completely of fat, with very little additional nutritional value. Bacon fat is roughly 40% saturated. Despite the likely health risks of excessive bacon grease consumption, it remains popular in the cuisine of the American South.

== Nutrients ==
One 10 g slice of cooked side bacon contains 4.5 g of fat, 3.0 g of protein, and 205 mg of sodium. The fat, protein, and sodium content varies depending on the cut and cooking method.

68% of the food energy of bacon comes from fat, almost half of which is saturated. A serving of three slices of bacon contains 30 milligrams of cholesterol (0.1%).

== Health concerns ==
Studies have consistently found the consumption of processed meat to be linked to increased mortality, and to an increased risk of developing a number of serious health conditions including cancer, cardiovascular disease and type 2 diabetes. As bacon is very high in salt, it comes with all the negative health effects associated with high salt intake.

Bacon can contain nitrites, which can form carcinogenic nitroso-compounds such as S-Nitrosothiols, nitrosyl-heme and nitrosamines. In the United States, sodium nitrite cannot exceed certain levels in bacon. Vitamin C (ascorbate) or sodium erythorbate can be added to bacon, which greatly reduces the formation of nitrosamines but has no effect on S-Nitrosothiols and nitrosyl-heme. Vitamin E (tocopherol) also reduces nitrosamine levels. Bacon fried at higher temperatures potentially has more nitrosamines than bacon fried at lower temperatures.

According to the World Health Organization in 2015, regular consumption of processed meats such as bacon increases the likelihood of developing colorectal cancers by 18%.

== Alternatives ==
Several alternatives to and substitutes for bacon have been developed for those who cannot or prefer not to eat standard pork bacon, including beef, chicken, turkey, bison, soy, and coconut bacon.

=== Turkey bacon ===
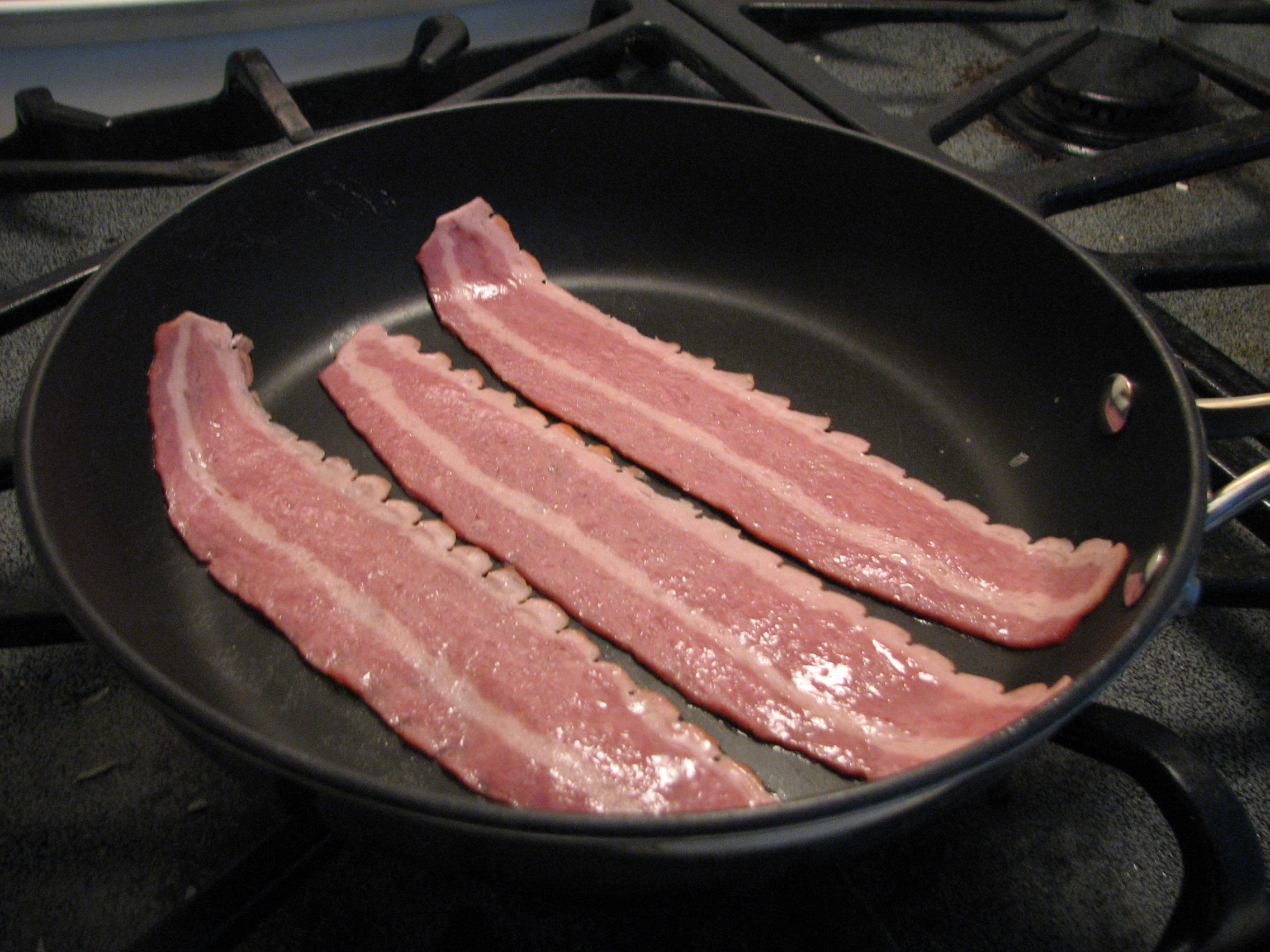
Chopped, formed, colored, and flavoured turkey bacon strips

Turkey bacon is consumed by some as an alternative to pork bacon for health benefits, religious laws, or other concerns. It is lower in fat and food energy than bacon, but is used similarly.

The meat for turkey bacon comes from the whole turkey, which is chopped and reformed into strips to resemble bacon, and can be cured or uncured, or smoked. Turkey bacon is cooked by pan-frying. Cured turkey bacon made from dark meat can be less than 10% fat. The low fat content of turkey bacon means it does not shrink while being cooked and has a tendency to stick to the pan.

=== Macon ===
"Macon" is produced by curing cuts of mutton in a manner similar to the production of pork bacon. Historically produced in Scotland, it was introduced across Britain during World War II as a consequence of rationing. It is today available as an alternative to bacon, produced for the Muslim market and sold at halal butchers; it is largely similar in appearance to pork bacon except for the darker colour.

=== Vegetarian bacon ===
Vegetarian bacon, also referred to as facon, veggie bacon, or vacon, is a vegetarian "bacon" made from plant matter. It has no cholesterol, is low in fat, and contains large amounts of protein and fibre. Two slices contain about 310 kilojoules (74 kcal). Vegetarian bacon is usually made from marinated strips of textured soy protein or tempeh (fermented soybeans).

== Bacon-flavoured products ==
The popularity of bacon in the United States has given rise to a number of commercial products that promise to add bacon flavouring without the labour involved in cooking it.

=== Bacon bits ===
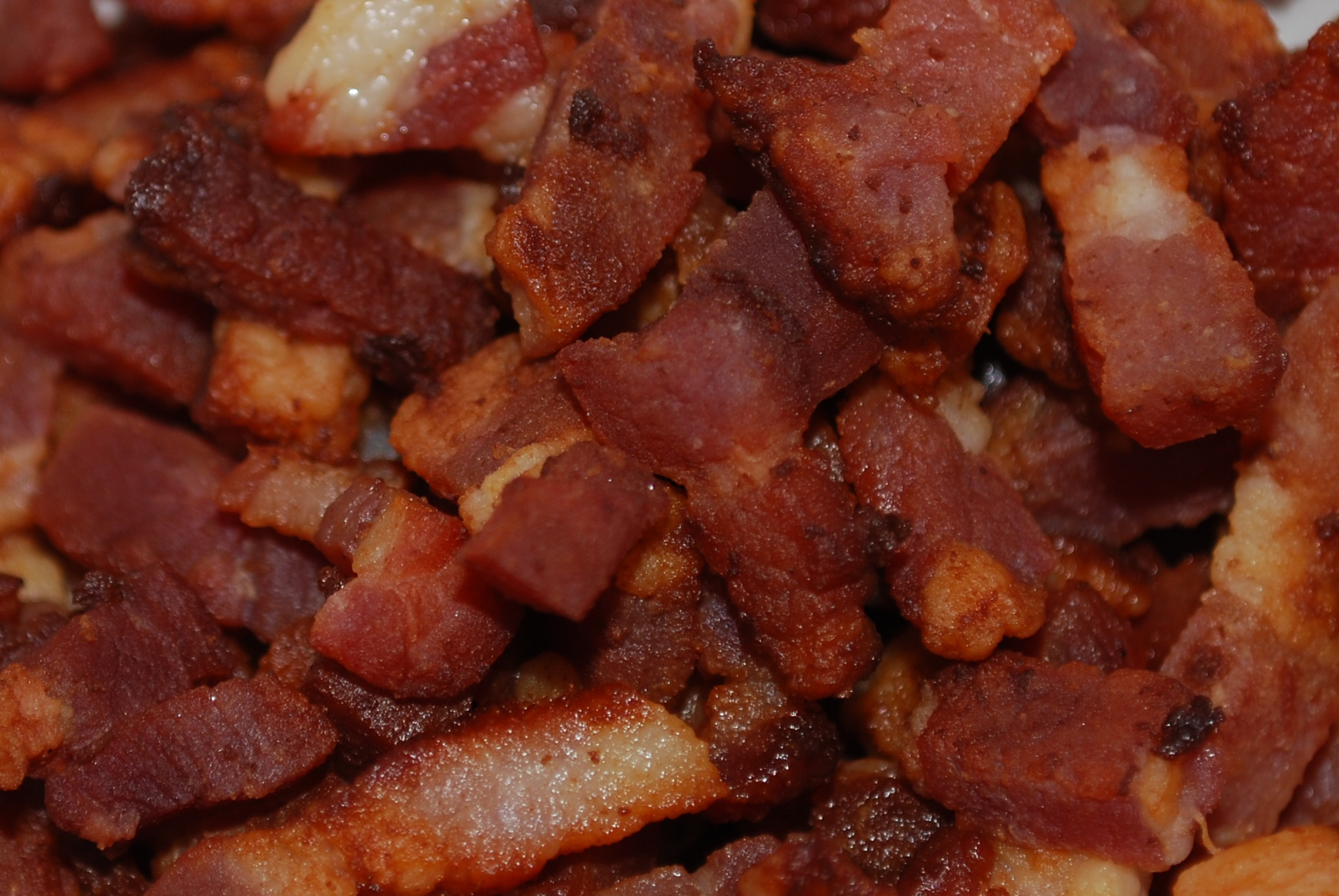
Bacon bits

Bacon bits are a frequently used topping on salad or potatoes, and a common element of salad bars. They are usually salted. Bacon bits are made from small, crumbled pieces of bacon; in commercial plants they are cooked in continuous microwave ovens. Similar products are made from ham or turkey, and vegetarian substitutes are made from textured vegetable protein, artificially flavoured to resemble bacon.

=== Other bacon-flavoured products ===
There is also a wide range of other bacon-flavoured products, including a bacon-flavoured salt (Bacon Salt), Baconnaise (a bacon-flavoured mayonnaise), Bacon Grill (a tinned meat, similar to Spam) and bacon ice cream.

== See also ==
Media related to Bacon at Wikimedia Commons

- List of bacon dishes
- List of bacon substitutes
- List of smoked foods
- Pancetta – Italian bacon made of pork belly meat
- Salo (food) – Eastern European traditional cured pork
- Torreznos – Spanish fried pork belly chunks
- Samgyeopsal – Korean grilled pork belly dish
- Zeeuws spek – Dutch cuisine
