= Chicken fried bacon =

American fried bacon dish

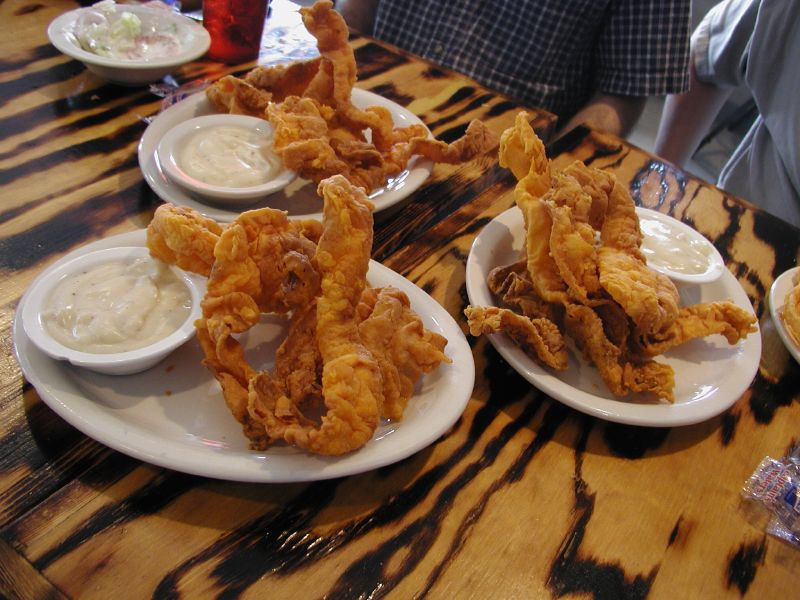
- Chicken fried bacon with cream gravy from Sodolak's Original Country Inn in Snook, Texas
- Course: Appetizer
- Place of origin: United States
- Region or state: Texas
- Serving temperature: Hot
- Main ingredients: Bacon, batter dip
- Variations: With gravy

Chicken fried bacon consists of bacon strips dredged in batter and deep fried, like chicken fried steak. It is an American dish that was introduced in Texas in circa 1991. Frank Sodolak of Sodolak's Original Country Inn in Snook, Texas, states that he invented the dish; however, there is a similar recipe in the 1954 cookbook Louisiana Cookery by Mary Land which uses salt pork instead of bacon. It is usually served as an appetizer with cream gravy or sausage gravy for dipping and sauce.

== Notoriety ==
Sodolak's version of the dish acquired enough of a reputation to be featured in Texas comedian John Kelso's Texas Curiosities. The entry states that "Things are not only bigger in Texas, they're greasier" and that "it's hard to imagine a more artery-clogging food."

Sodolak's version serves six strips of bacon, battered and fried, with a bowl of cream gravy. He and his restaurant were featured on a Texas Country Reporter episode; the web video has been watched hundreds of thousands of times on YouTube.

== Versions ==
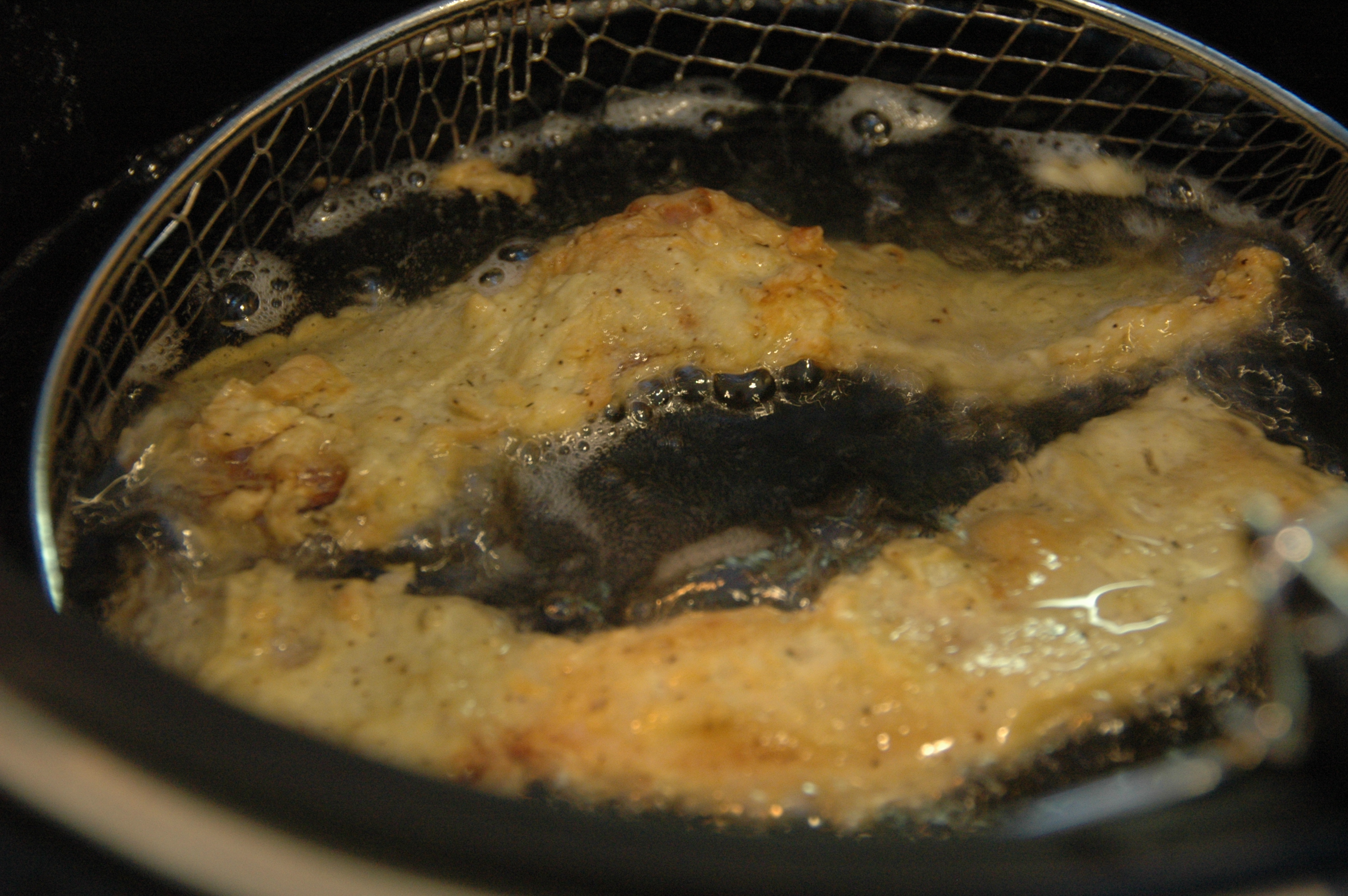
Homemade chicken fried bacon frying in a pan

Chicken fried bacon made by Glen Kusak of south Texas won the Big Tex Choice Award for Best Taste in the 2008 State Fair of Texas in Dallas. In recent years, the dish has made its way across America and it was served in Chicago at the Risque Cafe in Lake View. The Risque Cafe's version of "country-fried bacon" was served with white gravy and sold for $6. It was prepared using an egg wash, dredged in heavily peppered flour and deep fried in vegetable oil. The café's chef, Andrew Niemeyer, said he "played around with the idea" while a student of the Cooking and Hospitality Institute of Chicago.

== Health issues ==
Since the dish is rich in saturated fat, the majority of health experts who favor low-fat diets suggest consuming it in moderation or not at all. Sally Squires of The Washington Post acknowledged chicken fried bacon's appeal to the palate, but suggests moderation. Other experts note the dish's low nutritional benefits: "They've taken fat, they've double-coated it in fat, they've fried it in more fat, and then they've served it with a side order of fat."

== See also ==
- Bacon Explosion
- Chicken fried steak
- Chocolate-covered bacon
- List of deep-fried foods
