= Matt Timms =

Matt Timms (born c. 1974, Boston, Massachusetts) is an American promoter of food events, in particular a series of casual "takedown" competitions in which local amateur chefs compete to cook a particular ingredient. Timms is credited as one of the first of a wave of promoters to launch public amateur food contests in New York City and throughout the United States in the early 2000s.

== Food contests ==
Timms' first "Takedown" was a "Chili Takedown" in New York City in 2004. Tofu, Fondue, Cookie and Grits Takedowns followed, as well as a "Lamb Takedown", the "Brooklyn Beer Experiment", and the "Park Slope Pork Off". Hormel meats later sponsored a "Bacon Takedown". Timms says his events are a reaction to the more midwestern sensibilities of nationwide contests such as the Pillsbury Bake-Off, and the more structured, rules-oriented approach of the American Chili Society's sanctioned chili cookoffs. The Takedowns have become popular among what the New York Times describes as "obsessive home cooks" and "sustainability enthusiasts", due in part to Internet social connections. In addition to New York, takedowns have also been held in Boston, Massachusetts, Nashville, Tennessee, Saint Paul, Minnesota, and San Francisco, California.

In the lamb event, sponsored by the American Lamb Board, contestants are each given fifteen pounds of lamb to cook how they see fit, with awards from expert judges, as well as a people's choice award by vote of those who have paid to attend the event.

Matt Timms has been featured in Food & Wine Magazine's 40 Big Food Thinkers 40 and Under, and Chowhound.com's annual awards- The Chow 13

== Other details ==
Timms is also an actor and filmmaker. He shot the film, Up With Me, which was distributed by the Independent Film Channel.
