= Bacon jerky =

American snack made out of smoked, thick cut bacon

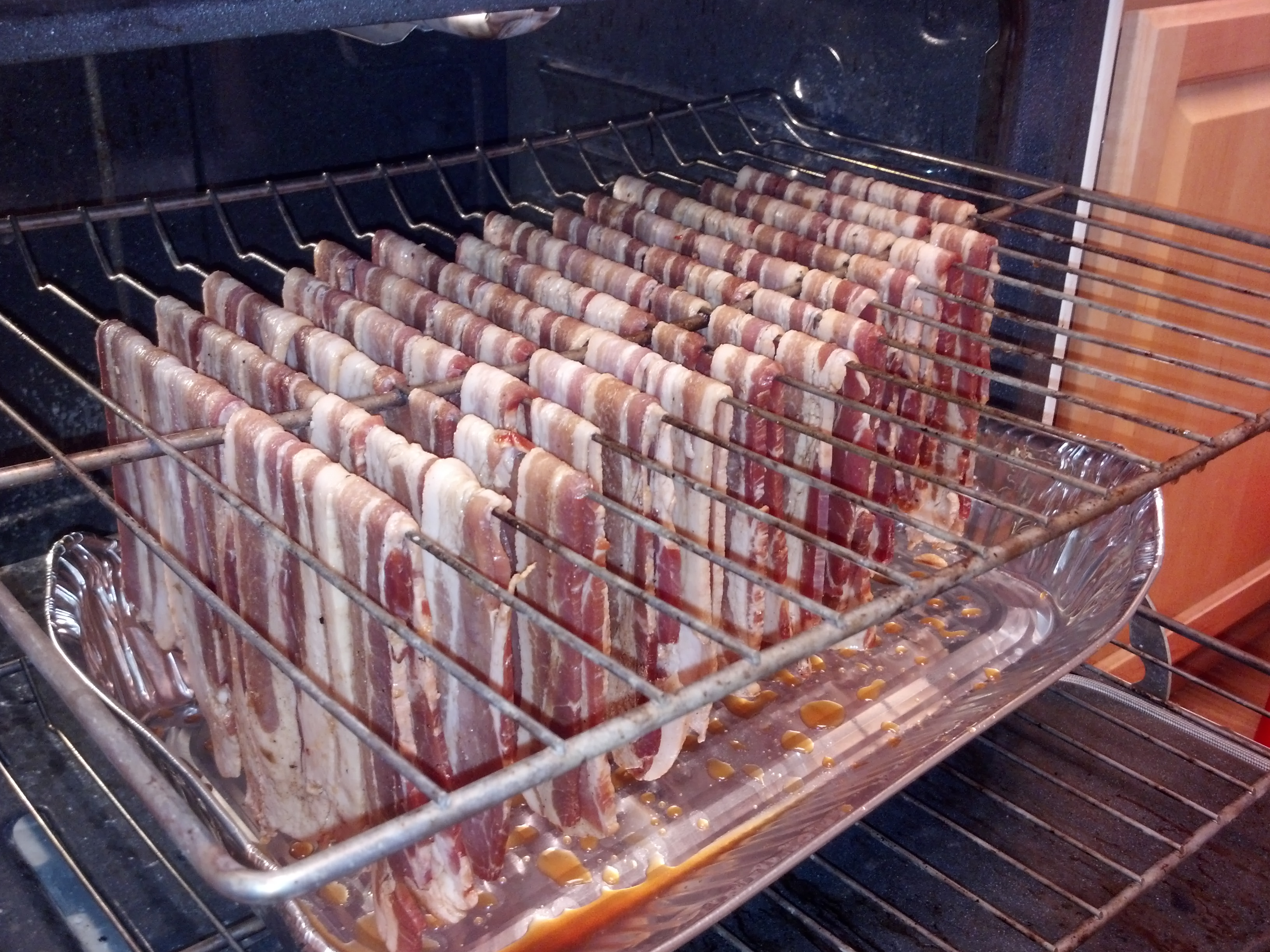
Bacon jerky being made with maple syrup and brown sugar.

Bacon jerky is an American snack made out of smoked, thick cut bacon. It is often flavored with maple syrup, barbecue sauce or sriracha. Although it is named after jerky, it is not prepared the same way. Traditional jerky is marinated and dried, bacon jerky is just smoked or dehydrated.

Bacon jerky was invented by accident when a meat processing team in Iowa was trying to create a thicker type of precooked bacon. A few years before this, it was independently invented by Rocco Loosbrock.
