= Bacon Explosion =

American pork dish

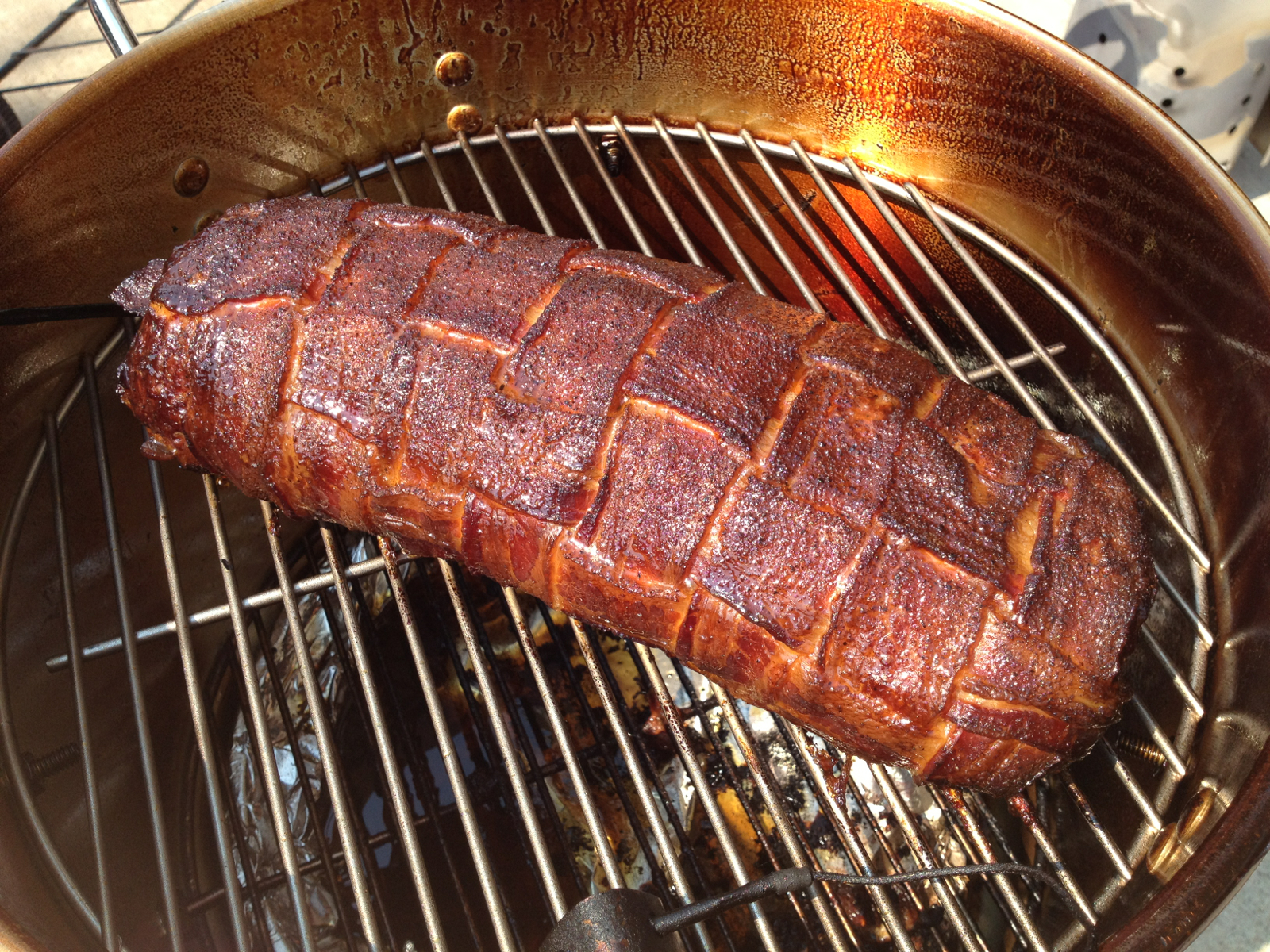
- A Bacon Explosion on a grill
- Type: Meat
- Course: Main course
- Place of origin: United States
- Region or state: Kansas City
- Created by: Aaron Chronister and Jason Day
- Invented: 2008
- Serving temperature: Hot
- Main ingredients: Bacon, sausage
- Food energy (per serving): 5,000+

A Bacon Explosion is a pork dish that consists of bacon wrapped around a filling of spiced sausage and crumbled bacon. The American-football-sized dish is then smoked or baked. It became known after being posted on the BBQ Addicts blog in 2008, and spread to the mainstream press with numerous stories discussing the dish. In time, the articles began to discuss the Internet "buzz" itself.

The Bacon Explosion is made of bacon, sausage, barbecue sauce, and barbecue seasoning or rub. The bacon is assembled in a weave to hold the sausage, sauce, and crumbled bacon. Once rolled, the Bacon Explosion is cooked (either smoked or baked), basted, cut, and served. The Bacon Explosion's creators produced a cookbook featuring the recipes which ultimately won the 2010 Gourmand World Cookbook Awards for "Best Barbecue Book in the World". The Bacon Explosion also won at the 2013 Blue Ribbon Bacon Festival.

== History and origin ==
Jason Day and Aaron Chronister posted the dish in December 2008 on their "BBQ Addicts" blog. It quickly became an Internet phenomenon, generating more than 500,000 hits and 16,000 links to the blog. It was also included on U.S. Republican political blogs, to which Day and Chronister responded with the comment "Republicans like meat." Various attempts to create the dish have been made across the internet, in the form of fan clubs and follow-up videos.

The inventors are experienced barbecue competition participants from Kansas City, and compete in cook-offs as the Burnt Finger BBQ team. According to the Telegraph, "They came up with the delicacy after being challenged on Twitter to create the ultimate bacon recipe." They christened their innovation the "Bacon Explosion: The BBQ Sausage Recipe of all Recipes." The Bacon Explosion is similar to a number of previously published recipes. Day and Chronister do not claim to have invented the concept, but assert the term "Bacon Explosion" as a trademark.

== Preparation ==
Preparing a Bacon Explosion "requires the minimum of culinary talent" and the ingredient list is short. It is made from two pounds (0.91 kg) of thick cut bacon, two pounds of Italian sausage, one jar of barbecue sauce, and one jar of barbecue rub/seasoning. The Bacon Explosion is constructed by weaving the bacon together to serve as a base. The base is seasoned and followed by the layering of sausage meat and crumbled bacon. Barbecue sauce and more seasoning is added before rolling it into a giant "sausage-shaped monster", sometimes using aluminum foil to help (note: it is not cooked inside the foil). It takes about an hour per inch of thickness to cook and is then basted with more barbecue sauce, sliced into rounds, and served. A prepared Bacon Explosion contains at least 5,000 kilocalories (21,000 kJ) and 18 oz (500 g) of fat, though a smaller 8-ounce (230 g) portion contains 878 kcal (3,700 kJ) and 2.1 oz (60 g) of fat.

Preparation and result

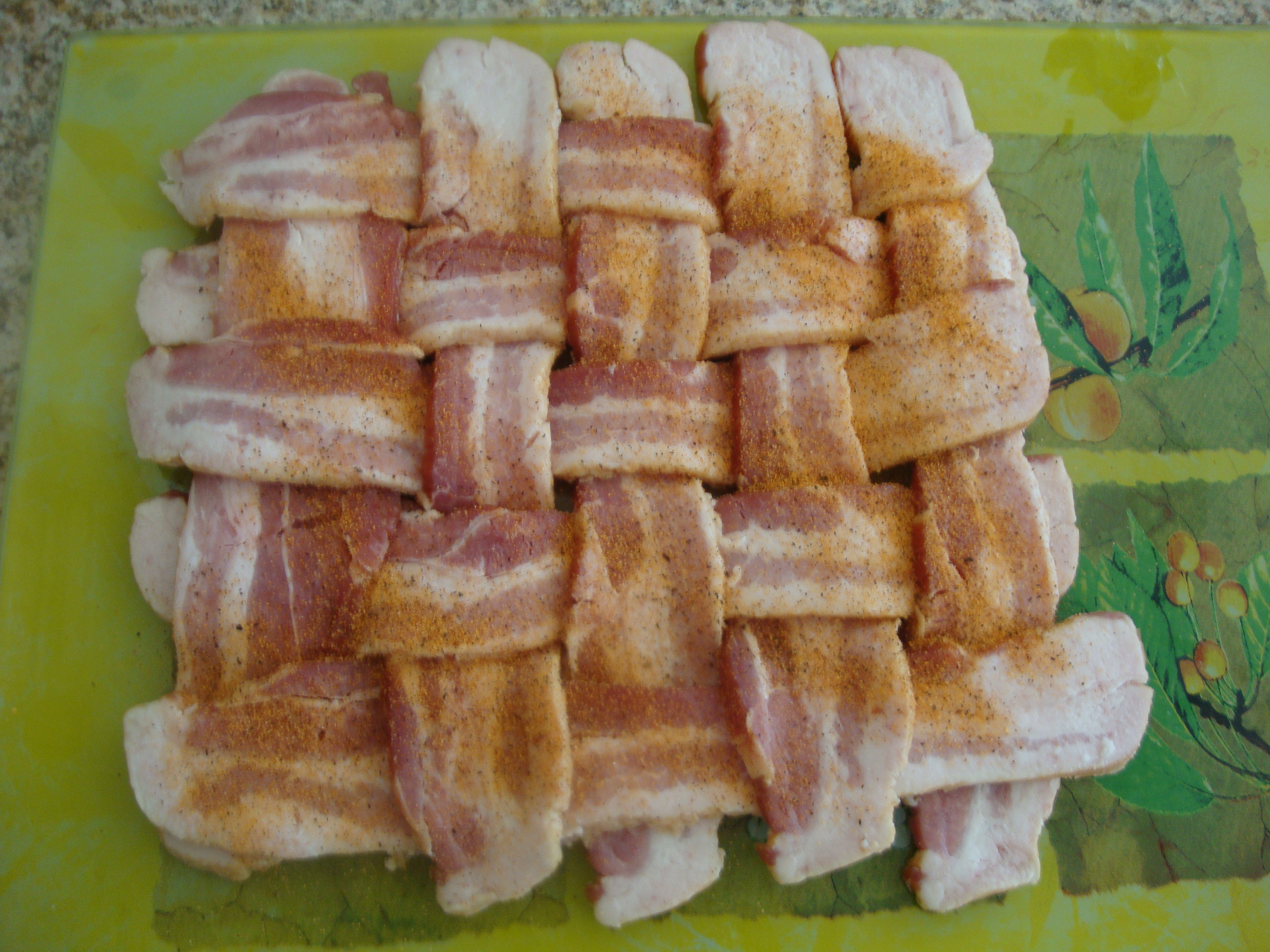
The woven bacon base

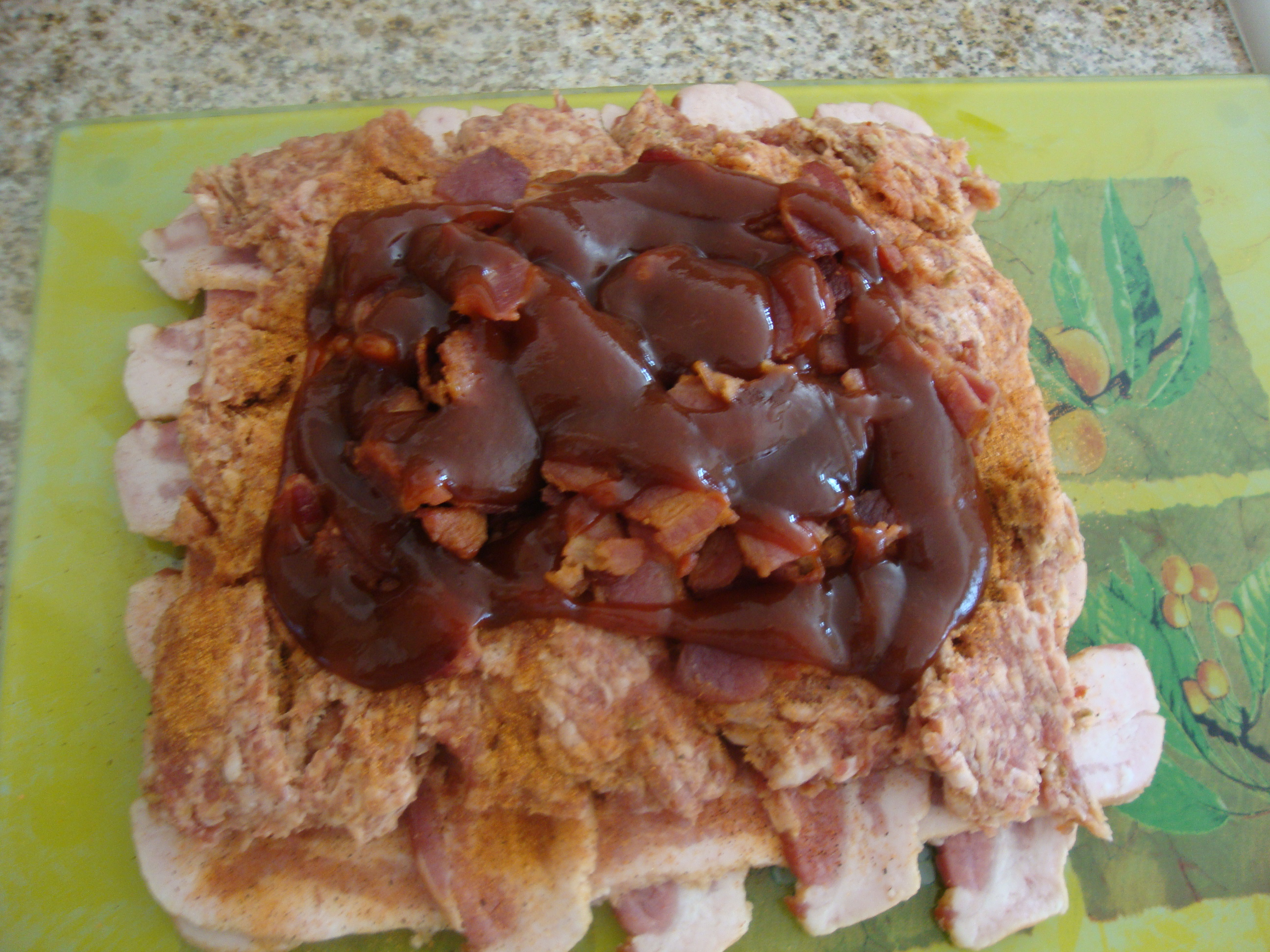
Sauced and ready for rolling

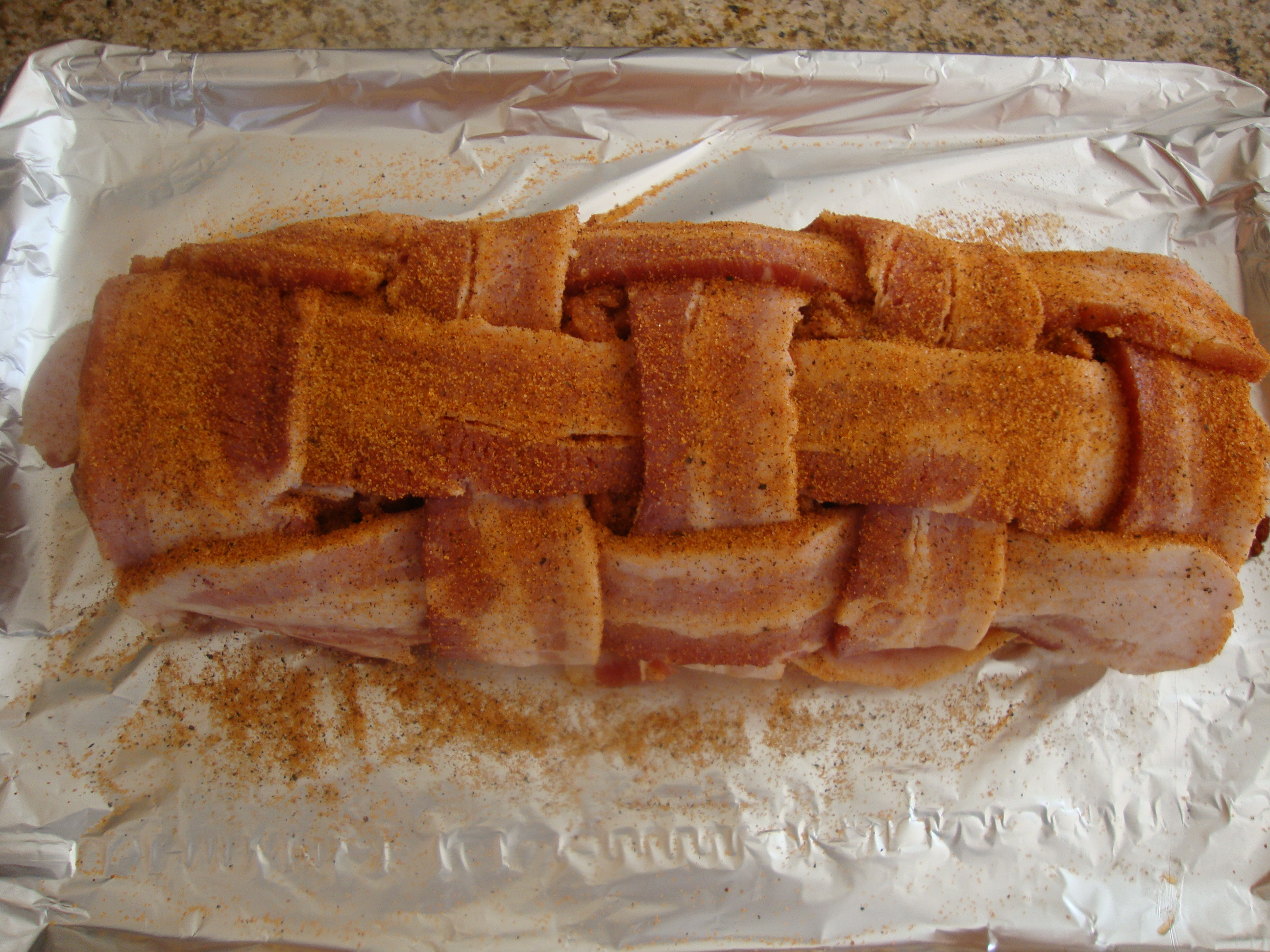
Rolled and seasoned prior to cooking

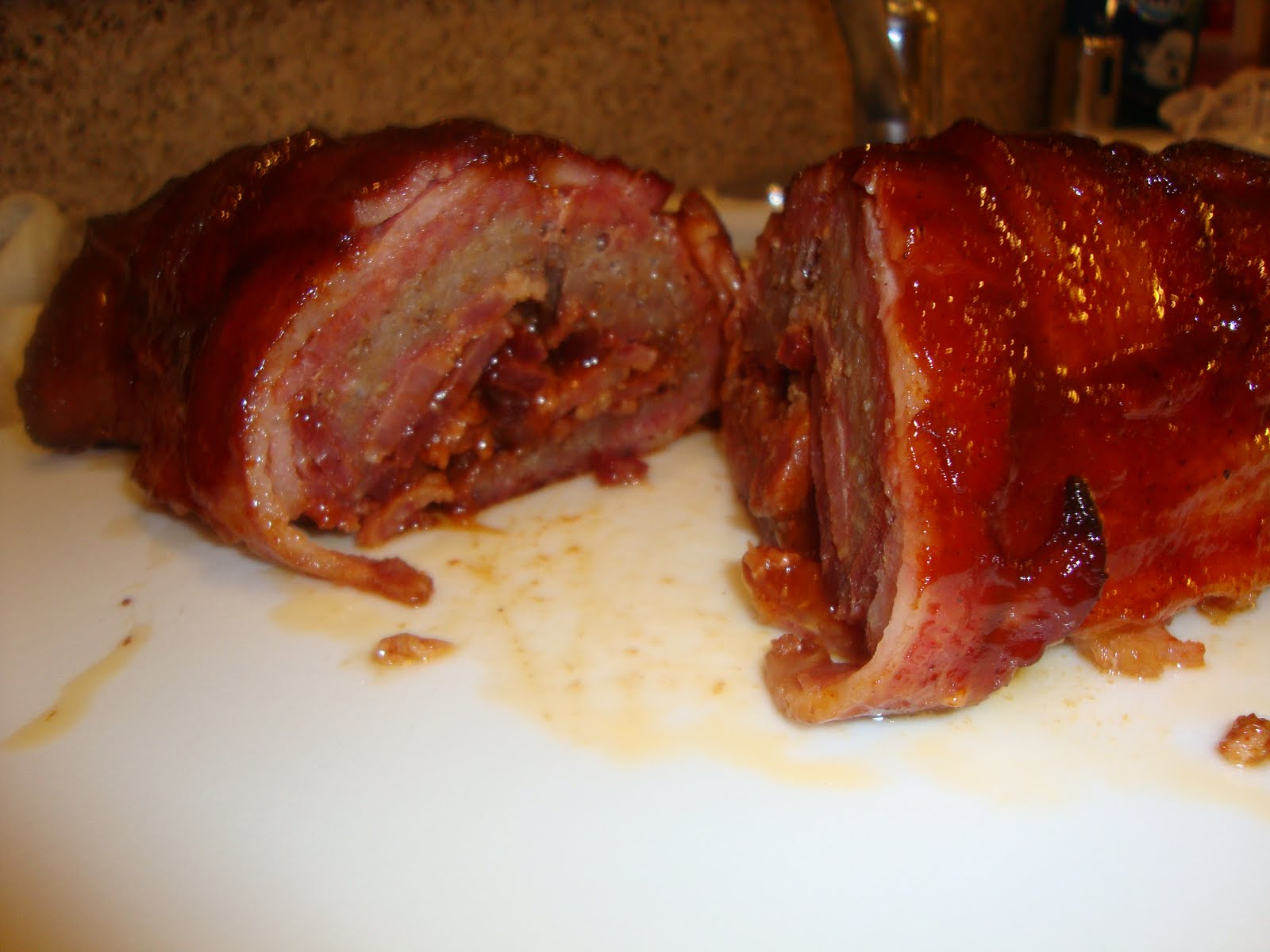
Interior shown after cooking

== Recognition ==
The popularity of the recipe has led to international coverage; including the US and the UK, German and Dutch media. The Daily Telegraph assessed that the "recipe is most popular on the web" and that the "5,000 calorie barbeque dish has become one of the most popular meal ideas in the world." Commentary in major publications about the health/obesity of Americans quickly suggested dishes like Bacon Explosion as the reason for "Why Americans are fat", while another asserted that it is not something a doctor would recommend. It has also been cited as an example of the use of Web 2.0 technology (Chronister is an Internet marketer).

Day and Chronister were reported to have "landed a six-figure book deal" for their book BBQ Makes Everything Better. The book, containing the recipe, became the US winner in the 2010 Gourmand World Cookbook Awards in the "Best Barbecue Book" category. The 2010 US winner The Essential New York Times Cookbook: Classic Recipes for a New Century by Amanda Hesser also contained the recipe for the Bacon Explosion. BBQ Makes Everything Better went on to win the "Best Barbecue Book in the World" category by the judges of the 2010 Gourmand World Cookbook Awards, and remained as the sole entry from an American. The Bacon Explosion won "Savory Dish" at the 2013 Blue Ribbon Bacon Festival which secured an entry in the Bacon World Championships.

== See also ==
- Bacon mania – Enthusiasm for bacon in North America
- Epic Meal Time – Canadian YouTube channel and web series
- List of pork dishes
- List of sausage dishes
- List of smoked foods
