= Cuisine of Nuevo León =

Culinary traditions of Nuevo León, Mexico

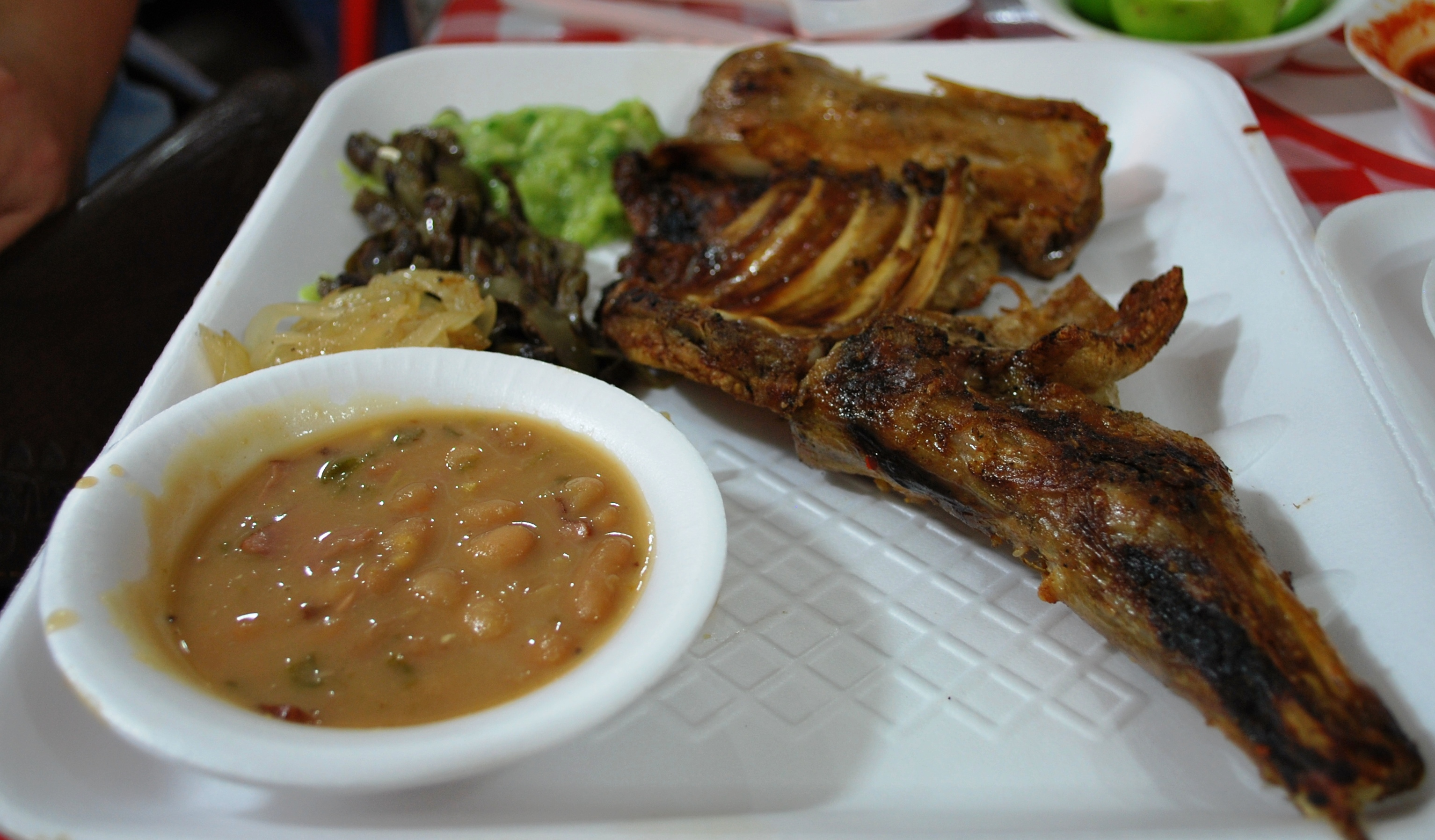
Cabrito is one of the main dishes of the Nuevo León's gastronomy.

The cuisine of Nuevo León is the regional cuisine of the state of Nuevo León, in northeastern Mexico. It combines three culinary cultures: Spanish Catholic, Sephardic Jewish (the state's founders) and the Tlaxcalan indigenous people who came from central Mexico.

To a lesser extent, the regional cuisine combines with some dishes from the southeastern United States, as a result of migration and the culinary influence of that region.

== List of dishes ==
- Carne asada
- Cabrito (al pastor)
- Machacado con huevo
- Discada
- Arrachera
- Chicharrón de la Ramos
- Tostada Siberia
- Cuajitos
- Flour tortilla
- Tripas
- Empalme
