= Pork rind =

Pork skin, raw or fried

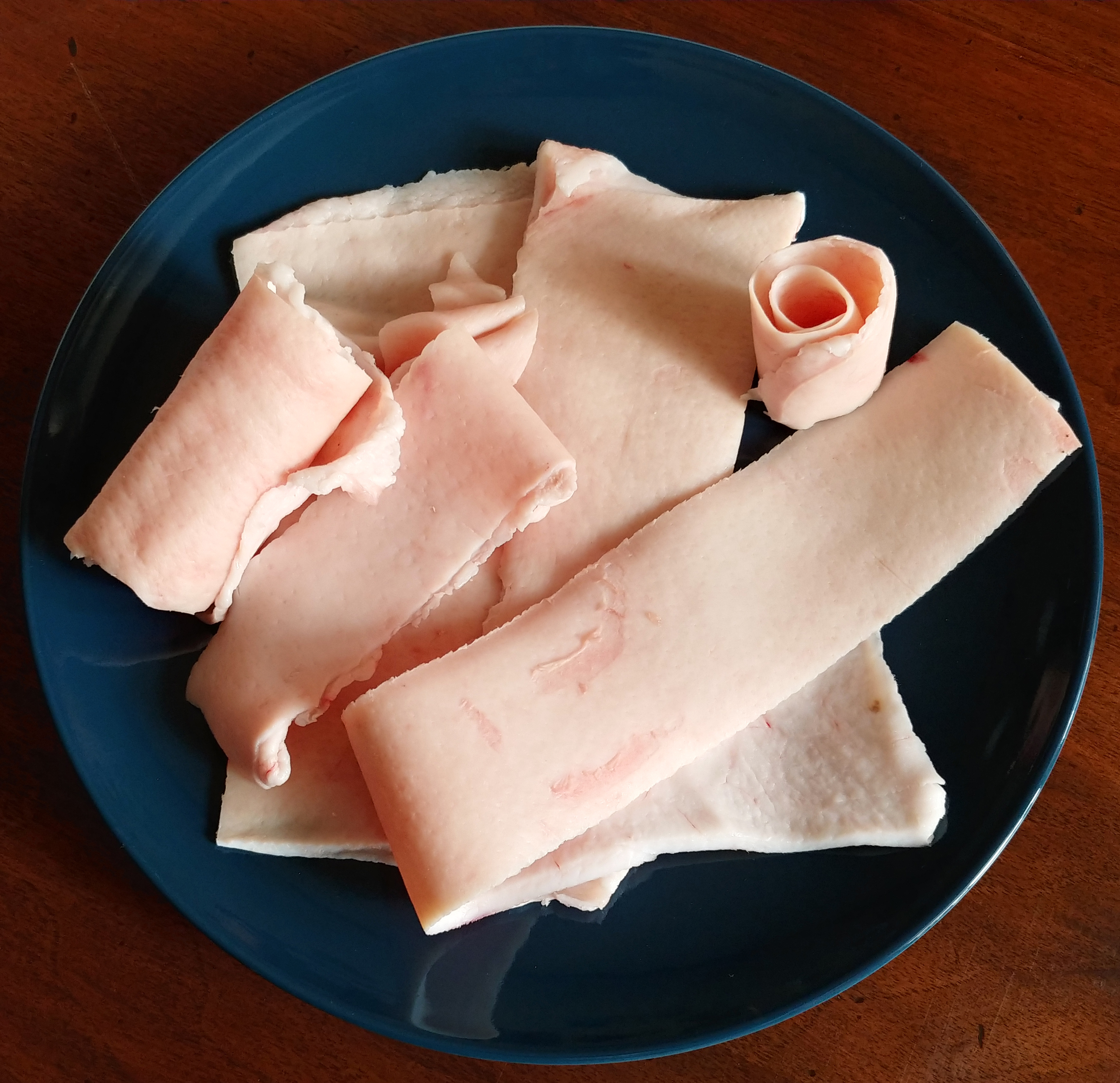
- Uncooked pork rinds
- Type: Cooking and baking staple
- Main ingredients: Pig skin

Pork rind is the culinary term for the skin of a pig. It can be used in many different ways.

It can be rendered, fried in fat, baked, or roasted to produce a kind of pork cracklings (US), crackling (UK), or scratchings (UK); these are served in small pieces as a snack or side dish and can also be used as an appetizer. The frying renders much of the fat, making it much smaller. They can also be used as a coating.

== Snack ==
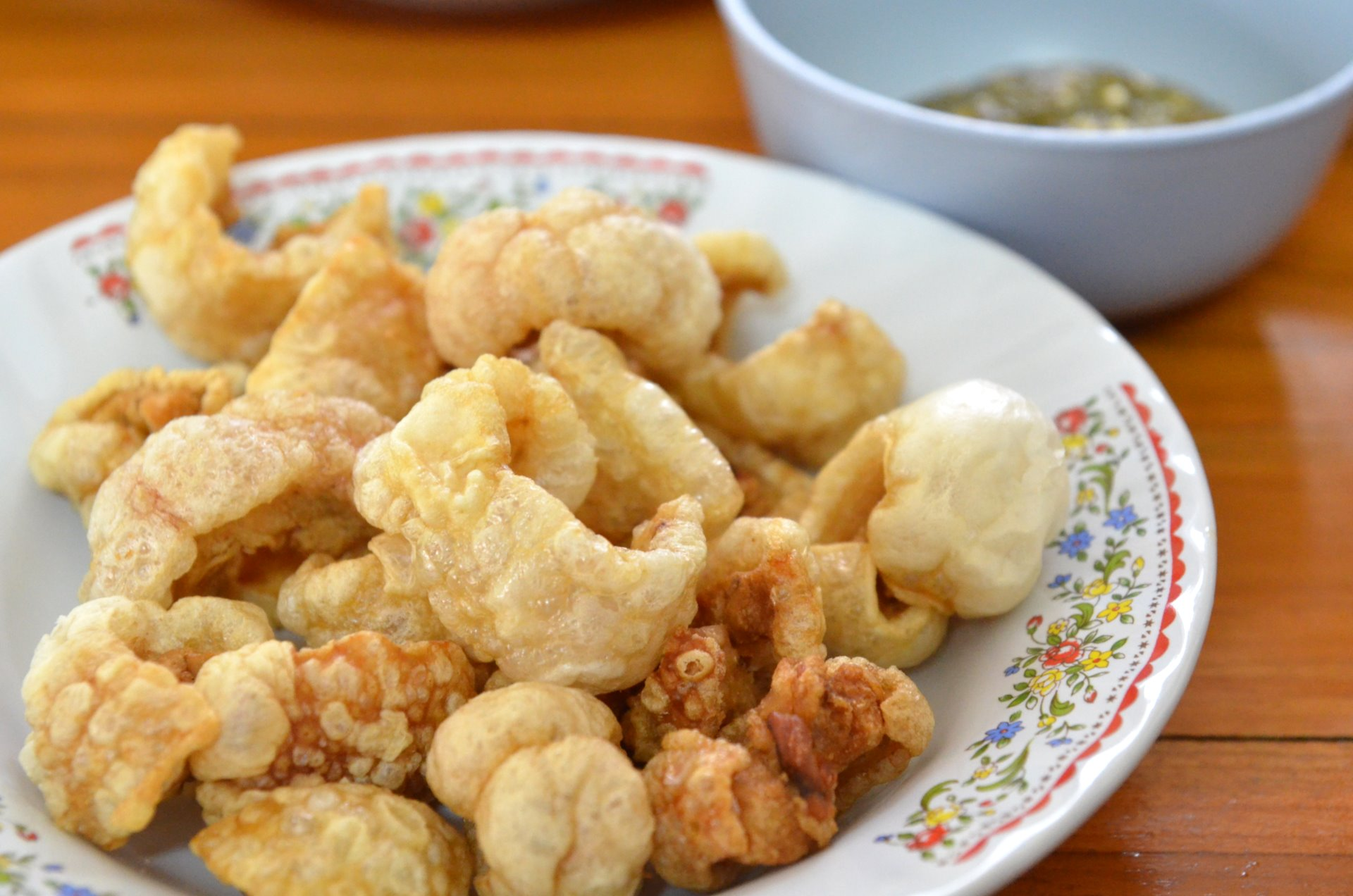
A bowl of pork rinds in Thailand

Often a byproduct of the rendering of lard, it is also a way of making even the tough skin of a pig edible. In many ancient cultures, animal fats were the only way of obtaining oil for cooking and they were common in many people's diets until the Industrial Revolution made vegetable oils more common and more affordable.

Microwaveable pork rinds are sold in bags that resemble microwaveable popcorn and can be eaten still warm. Pickled pork rinds, though, are often refrigerated and eaten cold. Unlike the crisp and fluffy texture of fried pork rinds, pickled pork rinds have a rich, buttery consistency, similar to foie gras.

== Preparation ==
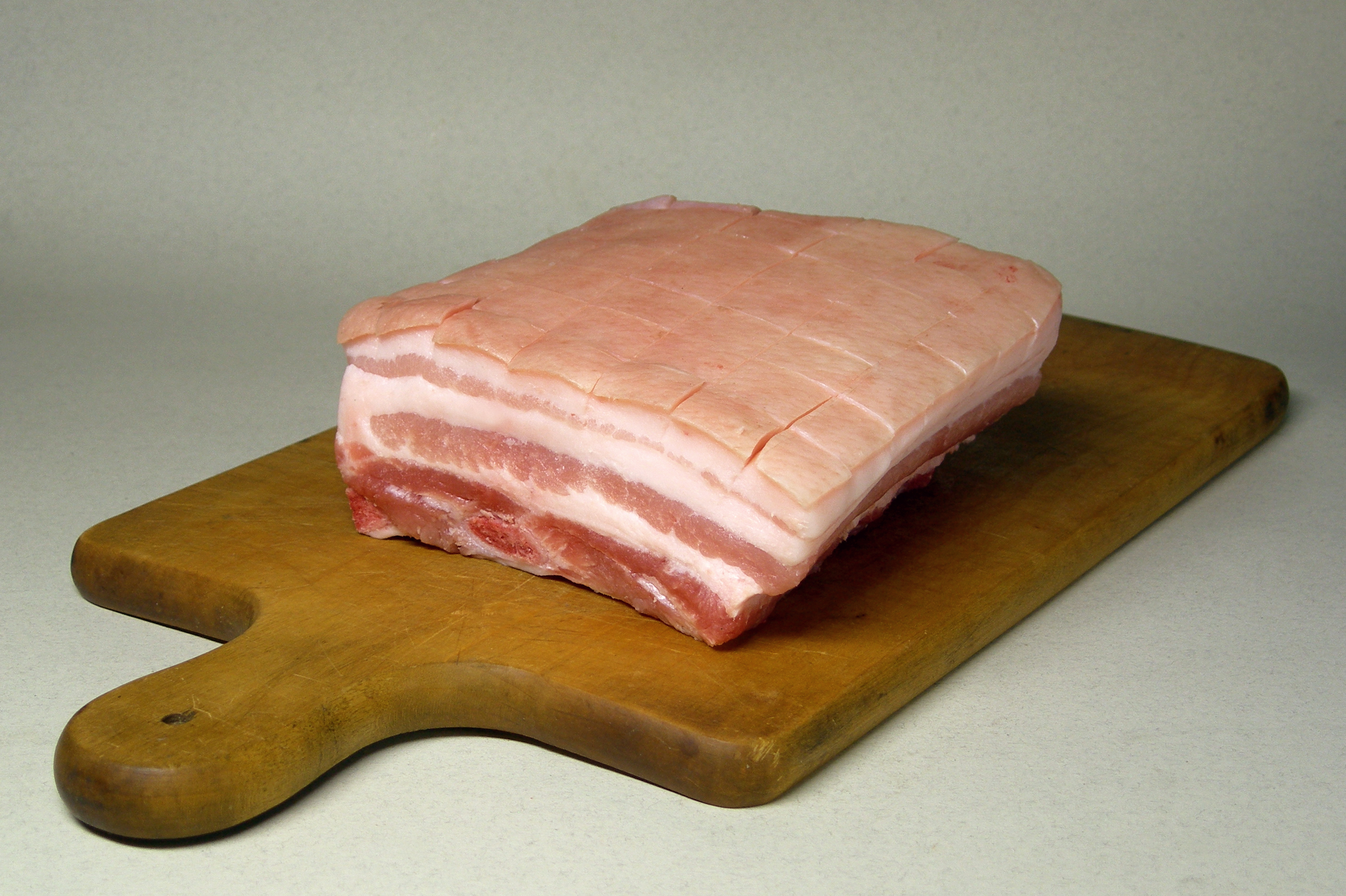
Uncooked pork belly with rind attached

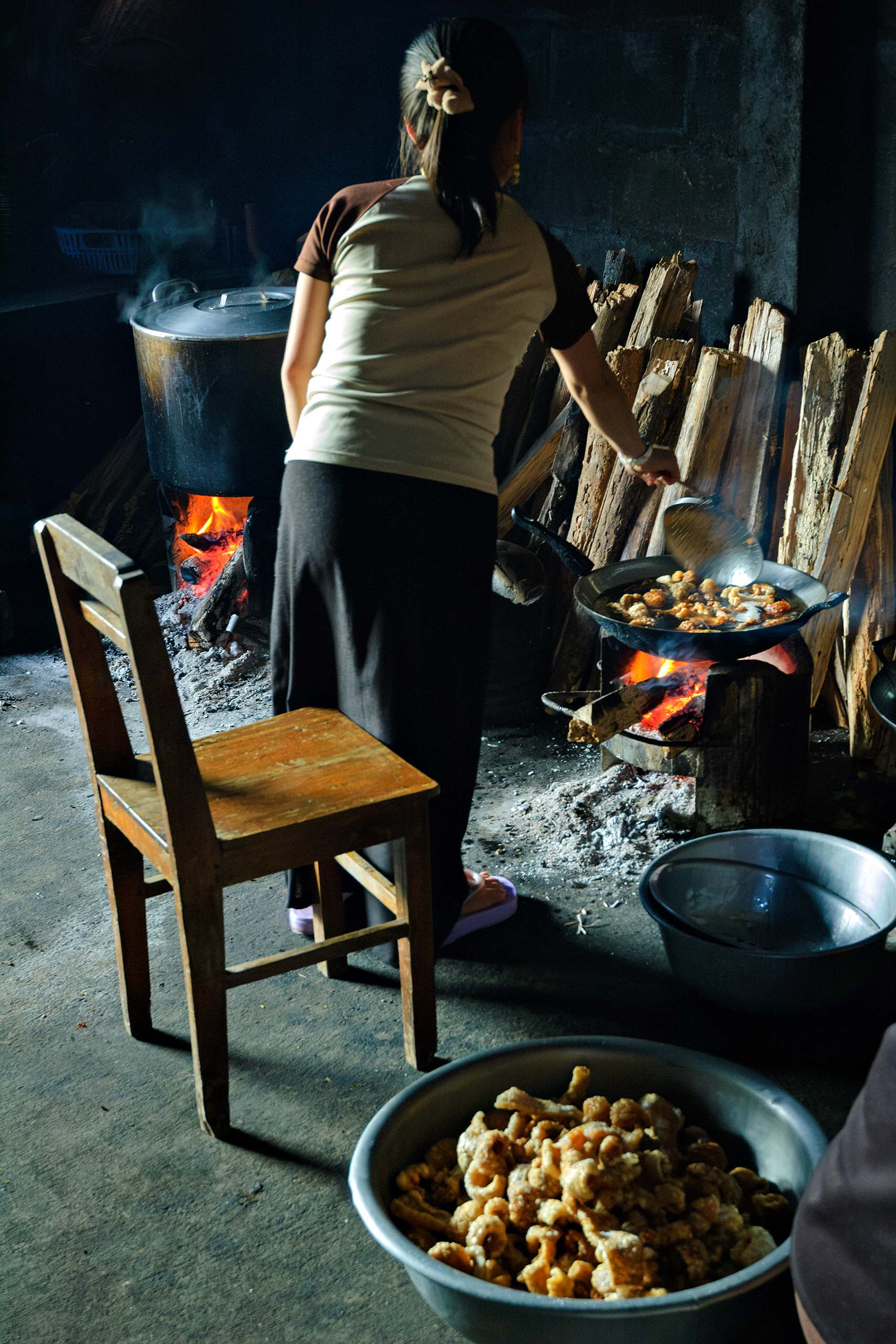
Pork rind, a woman frying pork skin over a wood fire, Kiou Ka Cham, Laos

For the large-scale production of commercial pork rinds, frozen, dried pork skin pellets are used. They are first rehydrated in water with added flavoring, and then fried in pork fat at 200–210 °C (392–410 °F). Cooking makes the rinds expand five times their original size and float on the oil surface. The rinds are then removed from the fat, flavored, and air-dried. Antioxidants may be added to improve stability.

== Nutritional value ==
Like many snack foods, pork rinds can be high in sodium and fat; however, they are low in carbohydrates and are sometimes considered an alternative snack food for those following a low-carbohydrate diet. According to Men's Health, a 28-gram (1 oz) serving contains nine times the protein and less fat than is found in a serving of potato chips, which are much higher in carbohydrates. They add that 43% of pork rind's fat is unsaturated, and most of that is oleic acid, the same healthy fat found in olive oil. Another 13% of its fat content is stearic acid, a type of saturated fat that is considered harmless because it does not raise cholesterol levels. Pork rinds are considered an incomplete source of protein because they contain very low amounts of some essential amino acids, including methionine, tryptophan, and histidine.

== Regional variations ==
=== Americas ===
==== Brazil ====
Torresmo is a popular snack in Brazil, usually served in bite-sized chunks. It is also a common accompaniment to typical dishes such as feijoada and virado.

==== Colombia ====
Chicharrónes is the term for pork rinds in Colombia. Two kinds of chicharrón exist: chicharrón toteado (exploded pork crackling), which has no meat in it and is similar to the lighter, commercial version; and chicharrón cocho, which is usually made with part of the pork meat attached to the skin. This makes for crispy skin and soft, juicy meat. It is traditionally served with beans, rice, fried eggs, chorizo, ground meat, avocado, and ripe plantain and arepa in a typical plate called bandeja paisa.

==== Canada ====
Scrunchions is a Newfoundland term for small pieces of pork rind or pork fatback fried until rendered and crispy. They are often used as a flavoring over other foods, such as salt fish and potatoes, and mainly used as a condiment for fish and brewis.

In Quebec, they are often called oreilles de crisse (Christ's ears) and are eaten almost exclusively as part of traditional cabane à sucre meals.

==== Costa Rica ====
Chicharrones are commonly served in homes or as snacks in bars and restaurants; some small restaurants also add them to their menus as vigorón or empanadas with Chicharrones and the snack dish called chifrijo.

Preparation could change from using pig fat as a base, boiling, and later frying, but many prefer using a wok-like pot and wood-fire cooking.

==== Mexico ====
Mexico is one of the world's largest producers and consumers of pork rinds, known as chicharrones. It may still have fat attached, called in Spanish chicharrón con manteca or chicharrón con "gordito" in central México.

It is commonly served in homes across Mexico. It can be served in a soup sometimes called chicharrón con chile (pork rind with chili sauce) or salsa de chicharrón (pork rind sauce). It is often served as an appetizer, or even offered as a snack at family reunions. However, chicharrones can be purchased on the street and are usually eaten with hot sauce and lime juice.

One popular breakfast is salsa de chicharron, (also chicharrón con chile or just chicharrón in some regions) cooked in green tomato or tomato salsa spiced with epazote. If the liquid is drained, the pork rind can be used in tacos, either as fast food products or kitchen-made.

The dryness in pork rind pairs with humidity and softness in pico de gallo (diced tomato, avocado, onion, cilantro [coriander leaf], and chili mix), and both are often paired to fill a corn tortilla as a taco.

A byproduct in frying rinds is the decanted residues in the fryer called asiento or boronas (grounds). The process requires uniformly cooking rinds, and while the product dehydrates, it cracks, losing small pieces, which are collected afterward and become a thick, fatty salsa, that can be mixed as an ingredient in other salsa de chicharrón recipes or used for its flavor and fat in pan frying. The second byproduct in frying rinds is lard.

Cueritos are the same as pork rinds, but are soft, chewy, and translucent, as they are not heavily cooked unlike the chicharrón, which is very crispy. They are easily available in Mexico as antojo and sold on the streets, usually by butchers, oftentimes served fresh, but one can also find them marinated with vinegar and onion at tienditas. If marinated, they are served with lemon and salt, powdered chili and probably with salsa Valentina.

Another variety is duritos, also called chicharrones de harina. These are similar to traditional chicharrones, only made with fried flour leavened with baking soda, instead of fried pig skin. This variety also features a pinwheel shape. Like cueritos, this food is popular with street vendors. They are infrequently sold in Mexico but tend to be a Mexican-American version of the popular chicharron.

In the Yucatan cuisine, it is often served along pork belly, known locally by the Maya word kastakán, blood sausage, and a spiced sausage made from pork entrails and habanero peppers known as buche.

In the Nuevo León cuisine, there is a variant called "Chicharrón de la Ramos".

==== United States ====
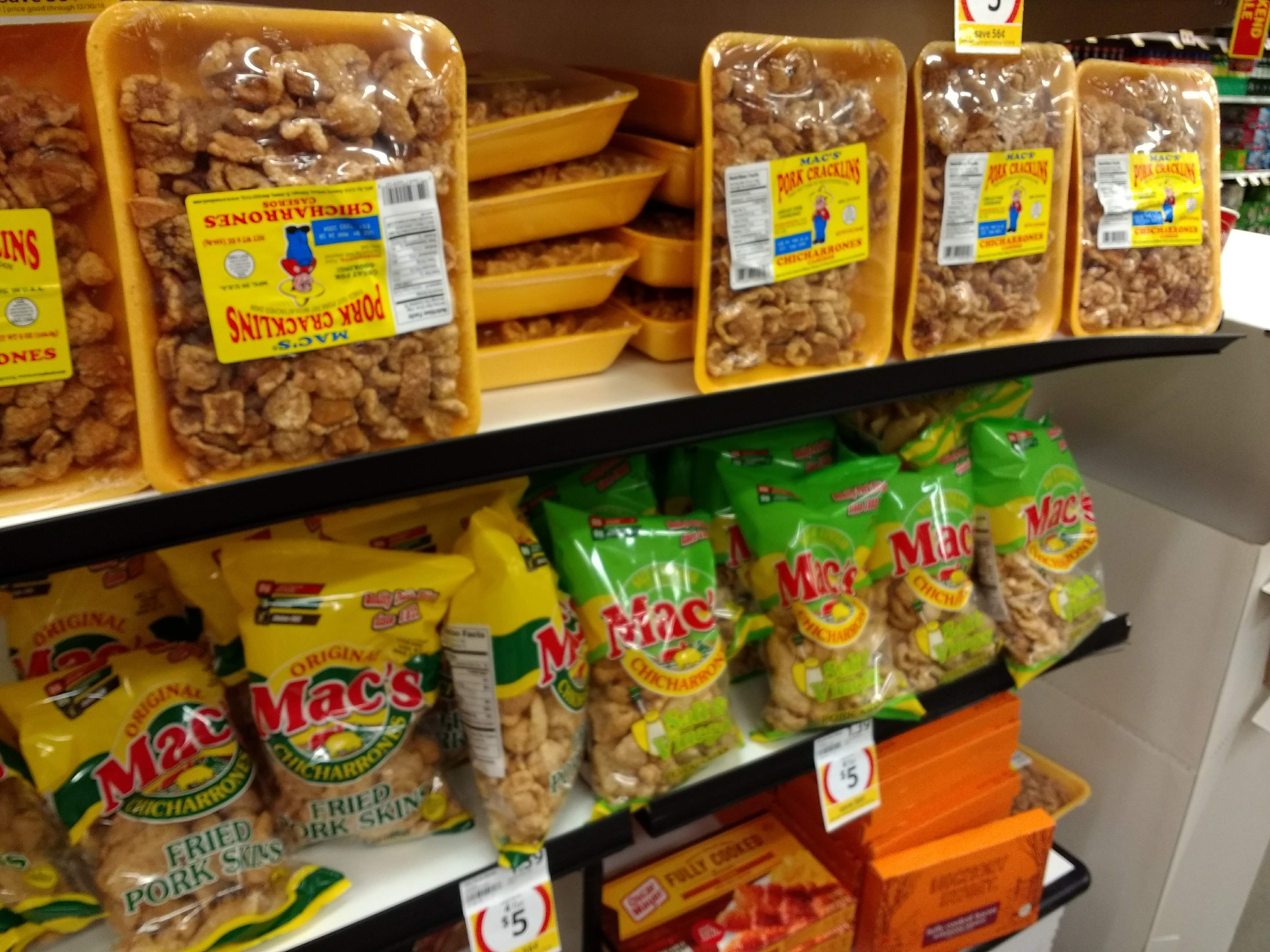
A selection of fried pork rind and crackling products at a shop in Florida.

Pork rinds is the North American name for fried or roasted skins of pigs. Pieces of fried meat, skin, or membrane produced as a byproduct of rendering lard are also called cracklings. Cracklings consist of either roasted or fried pork rind that has had salt rubbed into it and scored with a sharp knife: "A crackling offers a square of skin that cracks when you bite into it, giving way to a little pocket of hot fat and a salty layer of pork meat."

Cajun cracklings (or "cracklins") from Cajun cuisine (called gratons in Louisiana French), are fried pieces of pork fat with a small amount of attached skin, flavored after frying with a mixture of peppery Cajun spices.

Pork rinds normally refer to a snack food commercially sold in plastic bags. They are made in a two-step process: pork skin is first rendered and dried, and then fried and puffed. These are also called by the Spanish name, chicharrón, a term from Latin America.

Pork rinds sold in the United States are occasionally stained with a pink or purple spot. These edible marks are USDA stamps used on the skins to mark that they have been inspected. They are not harmful.

In 2003, sales of pork rinds experienced rapid growth, but they have dropped by $31 million since 2004, when they reached $134 million, and as of 2010 make up barely more than 1% of the salty snack market.

Pork rinds were a favorite snack of President George H. W. Bush. In an interview in 1988, he admitted to liking pork rinds in much the same way that Ronald Reagan was known to enjoy jelly beans. His statement that he liked pork rinds caused an immediate sales spike and manufacturer Rudolph Foods Company had to have its employees work overtime to keep up with the demand.

=== Asia ===
==== China ====
Zhīzhā (脂渣) is made from pork and is extremely popular in Qingdao, Shandong. It is a byproduct of lard. Lard is usually sold for around $1, but zhīzhā may be sold for about $30–40 and huāzhī for around $10.

- Jīngròu zhīzhā (精肉脂渣) – The skin is removed and sliced as thin as a gold coin. After the extraction of lard, the rest is hard and tastes like a salty cracker, seasoned with salt and MSG while it is hot.
- Huāzhī (花脂) – This is made from intestines, chopped and deep-fried twice, and used in stew or soup.

==== Philippines ====
Chicharon (derived from the Spanish chicharrón; also spelled tsitsaron) is usually bought from balut vendors as pulutan (i.e., appetizer dishes usually eaten with alcoholic beverages). It is also available in grocery stores, supermarkets, outdoor markets, sidewalk food vendors, and sari-sari stores (small, home made stores). Chicharon is prepared by deep-frying dried pork rinds and seasoning with salt. It is usually eaten with vinegar, hot vinegar (chopped chilies or soy sauce are added), or with bagoong, lechon liver sauce, or atchara (pickled green papaya). Chicharong manok, which is made from chicken skin, and chicharong bulaklak (lit. 'flower langeschicharrón' from its distinctive shape) made of pig intestine, are also popular. It is also used as a topping for pancit palabok and pancit malabon and in preparing pork sisig.

==== Thailand ====
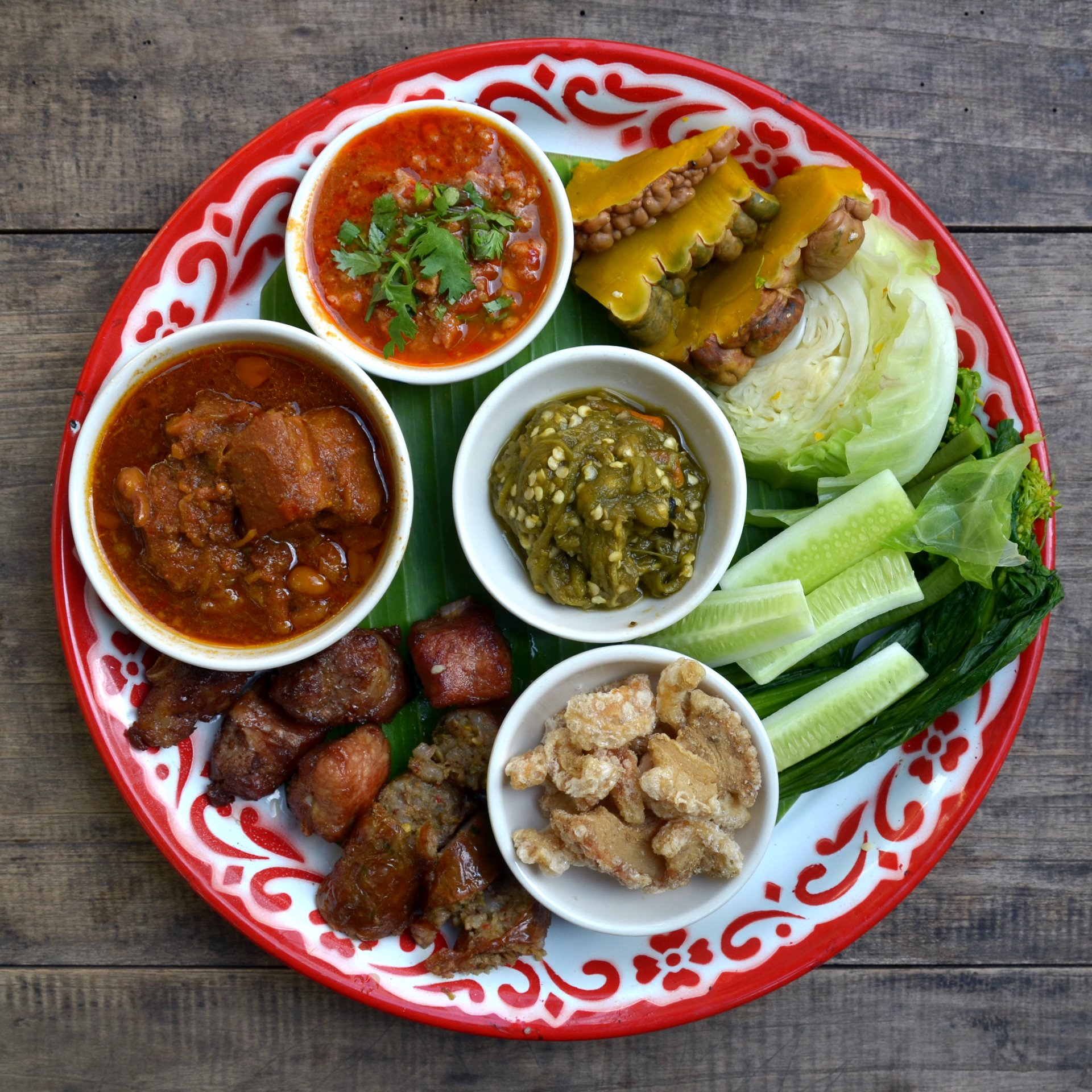
Khaep mu (in the bowl at the bottom of the image) served as one of the starters in this selection of northern Thai dishes.

Khæbh̄mū, or khaep mu, (Thai: แคบหมู, pronounced [kʰɛ̂ːp mǔː, kʰɛ́p mǔː]; Lao: ແຄບຫມູ), as crispy pork rinds are known in Thai cuisine, are a speciality of the northern Thai city of Chiang Mai. One way of making khaep mu is to first cure the pork skin, with an attached layer of fat, in salt for several days, after which it is soaked in water for a couple of hours. This ensures that the fat cells will expand, resulting in a "puffed skin" after cooking. The slabs of belly fat are then slowly cooked at low heat in, preferably, lard but other animal fat and vegetable oil can also be used. Similar to a confit, the pork thus treated can be stored. The pork is then cut into smaller pieces and baked in an oven until perfectly crispy. Another method of making the pork rinds again involves salting the pork skin, but instead of soaking it, the skin is hung out to dry in the sun after which it is sliced and deep-fried twice. Yet another way to make this dish in Thailand is to first cut the pork skin into strips, then boil them in water after which they are thoroughly dried before being deep-fried.

Northern Thai people most often eat pork rinds together with different Thai chili pastes, such as nam phrik num (น้ำพริกหนุ่ม, made with grilled green chili peppers) and nam phrik ong (น้ำพริกอ่อง, made with dried chili peppers, tomato and minced pork). It can also be eaten as a snack, either on its own, or with nam chim khaep mu (น้ำจิ้มแคบหมู), a dipping sauce made with lime juice, fresh chili peppers and a sweet chili paste. It can also figure as an accompaniment to Thai dishes such as nam ngiao (น้ำเงี้ยว) and the famous Thai salad som tam (ส้มตำ) or used crushed as an ingredient, for instance in sa makhuea (ส้ามะเขือ), a northern Thai salad made with minced pork and Thai eggplant.

==== Vietnam ====
Pork rinds used to be a very common food in Vietnam before the Đổi Mới economic reforms in 1986. Due to various economic difficulties in the pre-Đổi Mới era, cooking oil and meat were still considered luxury goods, and consequently liquid fat and pork rinds became excellent replacements in Vietnamese daily meals. With the country's improved economic situation, pork rinds are no longer a substitute food, but rather a special component in many Vietnamese dishes, such as cơm tấm, noodles and snails (bún ốc), noodle soup, etc. In Vietnamese, pork rinds are called tóp mỡ (lit. 'dried piece of fat').

==== Indonesia ====
Krupuk kulit (Javanese: rambak) is a traditional Indonesian krupuk (cracker). Most krupuk kulit sold in Indonesia are made from cattle skin, either cow or water buffalo (kerbau); however, in areas with large non-Muslim populations such as Bali, Batak, Toraja, Dayak lands, and most Chinatowns in Medan, Jakarta, Surabaya, Semarang, Surakarta, and other cities, pork rinds (krupuk kulit babi) are popular and widely available. Compared to common cow skin crackers, krupuk kulit babi have a lighter colour and crumble more easily. There is also a variant which uses frog skin, known as krupuk kulit kodok.

=== Europe ===
In most Slavic countries, they are known as škvarky (as in the Czech Republic and Slovakia), skwarki (as in Poland), șorici (as in Romania), shkvarký (as in Russia or Ukraine), пръжки (джумерки) (as in Bulgaria), ocvirki (as in Slovenia) or Čvarci (as in Croatia, Serbia or Bosnia). Often they are mixed with lard as a type of spread, and served with bread. They are particularly popular in this form during celebrations when alcohol is to be consumed.

In Lithuania and Latvia, they are mixed with boiled peas and served as a snack. This is called žirniai su spirgučiais in Lithuanian and zirņi ar speķi in Latvian (lit. 'peas with cracklings'). They are also usually served with Lithuanian cepelinai.

They are part of the traditional Czech dish bramborové knedlíky se škvarkama a kyselým zelím, or potato dumplings with cracklings and sauerkraut.

In Hungary, cracklings – tepertő – may be made from pork or goose skin. They are usually served with salt and bread, sometimes vegetables. Their consumption is at its peak during the season of pig slaughter, as it is then when pork rind is at its freshest. It is usually consumed as a breakfast or dinner food. A kind of biscuit, tepertős pogácsa, is made with crackings.

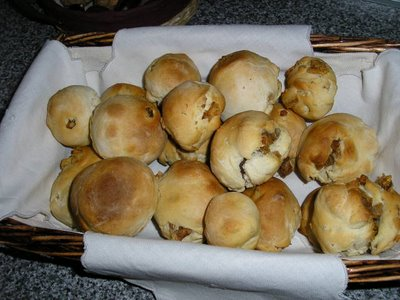
Traditional Portuguese bolo de torresmos

In Italy, the outer layers of the pig's skin are pressed, dried and aged, creating ciccioli. In another preparation, pork rind is slowly cooked, producing a soft product known as cotica. This is a common addition to ragù, and, before an uptick in health conscious cooking, pasta e fagioli. As an addition to ragù, cotica is rolled tightly, enclosing garlic, raisins, parsley and pine nuts. At service, it is sliced into thin portins.

In Spain, they are called chicharrones. The dish was brought to South America where they became popular. In Catalonia (Spain), a llardó is each of the pieces of fried animal fat (especially of pork) that remain after pressing to extract the lard, so that they are golden and crunchy. They are sold by weight in salumerias in Catalonia, and during Carnival they are often also found in pastries. The llardó is used as an appetizer, as a snack, and is essential to make the coca de llardons, a cake typical in Catalonia during different festivals. Some salumerias use them to make egg butifarras, since in Barcelona both products are strongly associated to Fat Thursday.

In Portugal, as in Brazil, they are called torresmos. They are a common addition to other cooked dishes, for the added flavor and fat content, or also enjoyed as a snack. Also used to make bolo de torresmos ('pork rind cake'), which is a traditional bread baked with bits of torresmos inside it.

In Denmark, Norway, and Sweden, flæskesvær/fleskesvor/fläsksvål is a traditional snack served cold and dried (compare flæskesteg).

==== United Kingdom ====
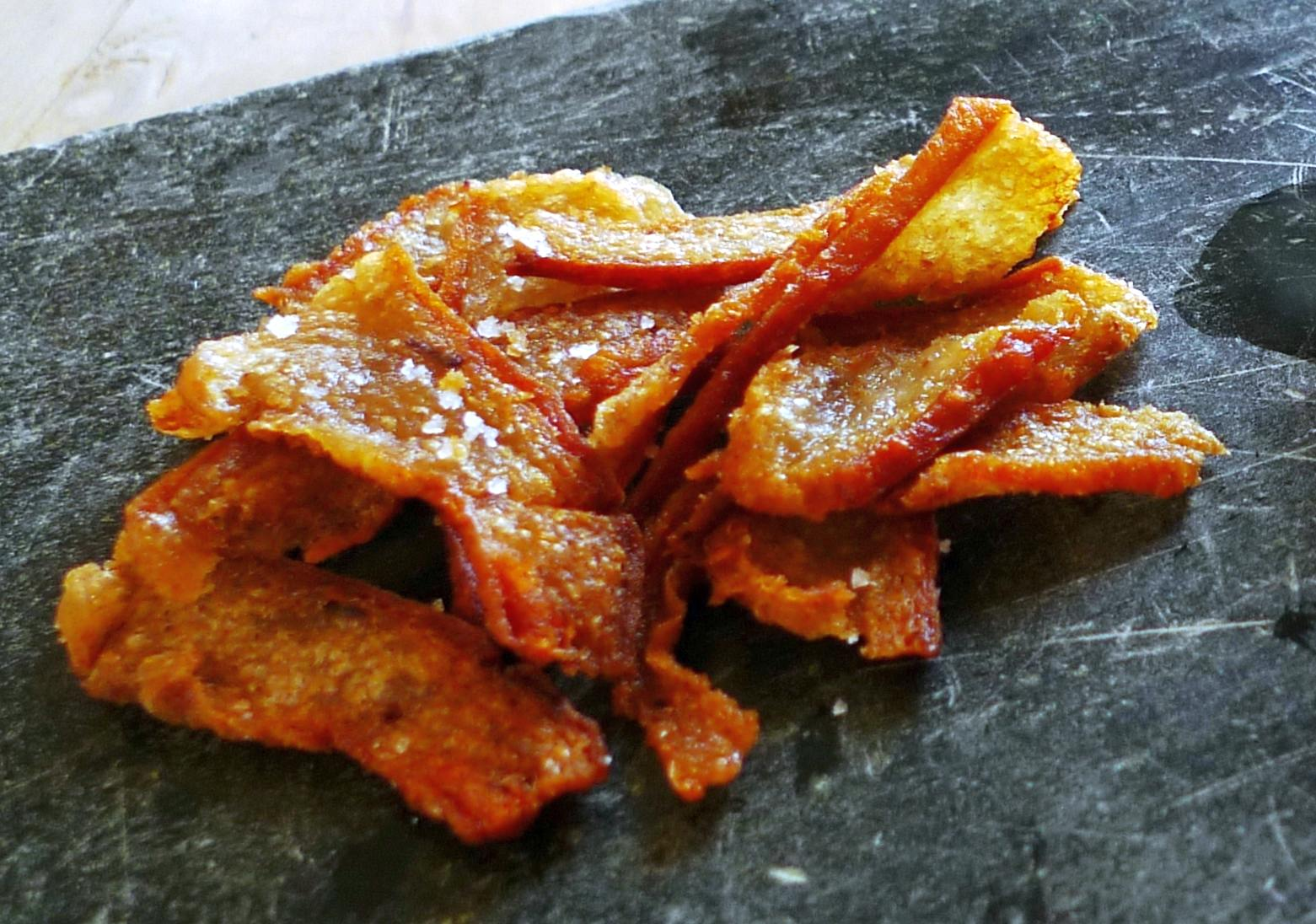
Pork scratchings served in an English gastropub

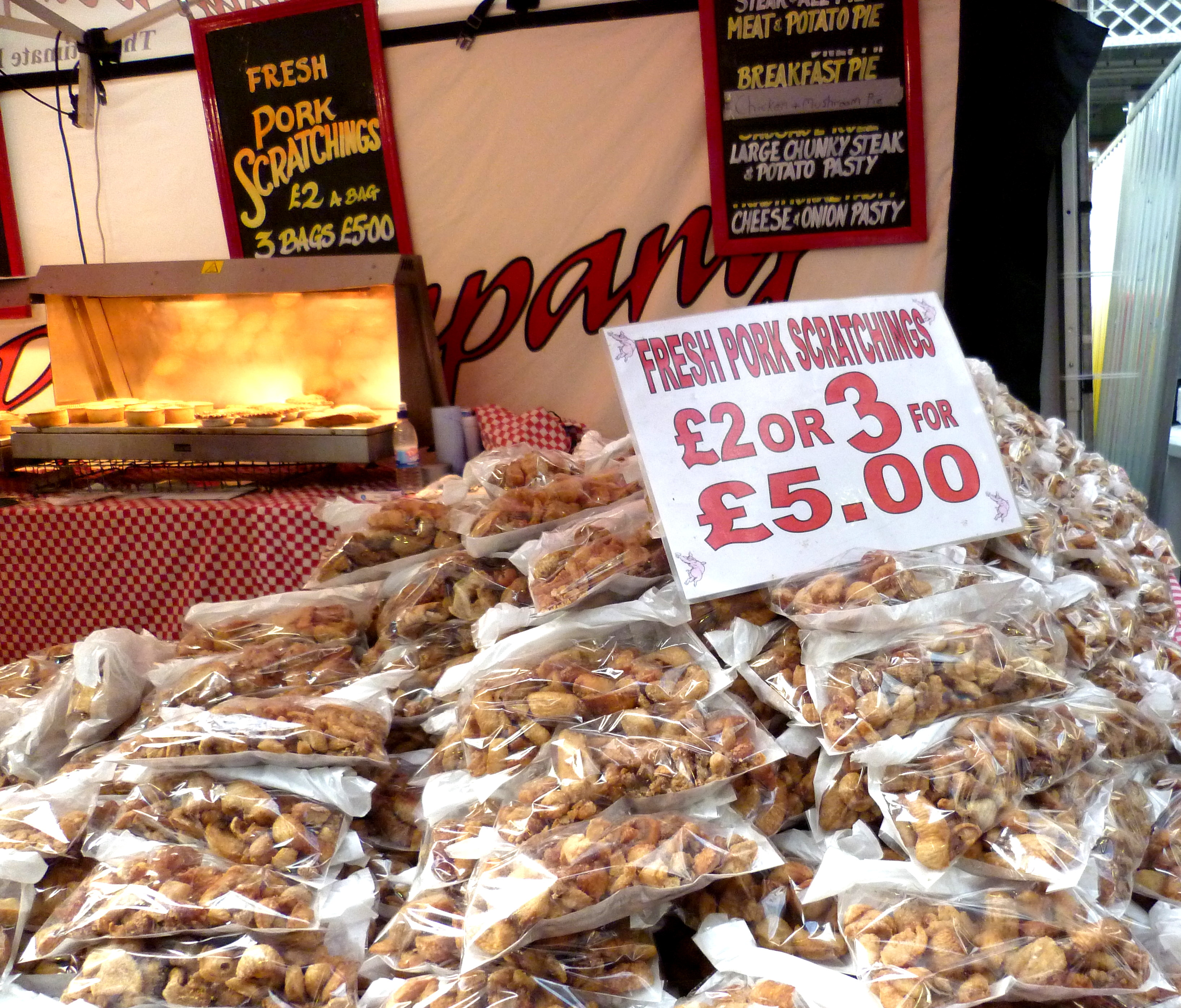
Pork scratchings for sale at the Great British Beer Festival 2016

Pork scratchings is the British name for deep-fried, salted, crunchy pork rind with fat produced separately from the meat, eaten cold. Pork scratchings typically are heavy and hard, have a crispy layer of fat under the skin, and are flavoured only with salt. The pig hair is usually removed by quickly burning the skin of the pig before it is cut into pieces and cooked in hot fat. In comparison, crackling is distinguished from normal pork rind in the United Kingdom by the fact that it is cut from a freshly roasted joint of pork (usually pork loin or pork belly), or the edge of a pork chop, after the meat has finished cooking. It is usually served warm or hot, before the fat on the underside of the roasted skin can finish cooling down and re-solidifying. Larger joints of pork from the leg or shoulder when roasted in the oven can produce an unevenly crackled rind due to the curvature of the joint: this can be rectified by removing the rind after the joint is cooked and resting, and laying it flat on a baking tray or directly on the oven shelf bars and further cooking at a high oven temperature or by using the grill setting.

Pork scratchings are sold as a snack food in a variety of common brands. Unlike the physically large, but relatively light bags of deep-fried skin without the fat sold around the world, in the UK they are sold in relatively small bags which usually weigh between 42 and 90 grams (1.5–3.2 oz) and are eaten as an accompaniment to a pint of beer in a pub, just like crisps or peanuts. Scratchings can also be bought from butchers, supermarkets or newsagents. They have been taken to the North and South Poles on various expeditions, because of their high energy content.

There are three distinct types. Traditional scratchings are made from shank rind and cooked just once. Pork crackling is also made from shoulder rind but is fried twice. It is first rendered at a low heat, and then cooked at a higher temperature for a less fatty, crispier result, or cut from roasted pork joints to produce heavier but less fatty results. A more recent development is the pork crunch, which is made from the back rind and again double-fried to become a large, puffy snack. Some supermarkets now sell just the layer of skin and fat (no meat), in a raw form for home grilling or roasting, or cooked and ready to eat from hot food counters. The term "crackling" is also often applied to a twice-cooked variety of pork scratchings.

== See also ==
- Ciccioli, an Italian food made from pressed pork scraps
- Čvarci
- Gribenes, a Jewish snack made from chicken skin
- Krupuk kulit, a similar Indonesian snack but more commonly made from cattle skin.
