= Museum of Salo (disambiguation) =

The Museum of Salo is a museum dedicated to salo (cured pork fat) in Lviv, Ukraine.

Museum of Salo may also refer to:

- Museum of the city of Salò, Italy
- Museum of the city of Salo, Finland
- Salo Art Museum, Salo, Finland
