= Rudolph Foods =

American snack food producer

- Industry: Consumer Products
- Founder: John Rudolph
- Headquarters: Lima, Ohio
- Products: Pork rinds; Pork cracklings; Pellets
- Number of employees: 400
- Website: www.rudolphfoods.com

Rudolph Foods is a producer of snack foods based in Lima, Ohio. They specialize in pork rinds and cracklings. The company has six facilities in the United States and three international ventures. It was founded in 1955 by John Rudolph.

== Community ==
In 2010, Rudolph Foods sponsored the Pork Rind Heritage Festival.

Pepe's El Original has sponsored Fiestas Patrias in Los Angeles. In 2010, Pepe's El Original hosted the contest Mi Amor, Mi Chicharrones in celebration of National Hispanic Heritage Month.

In 2010, Lee's Pig Skins sponsored the Smokin’ Pig Festival in Lake City, Florida and the Cracklin Festival in Port Barre, Louisiana.

== Pork Rind Appreciation Day ==
In January 2011, Rudolph Foods declared "National Pork Rind Appreciation Day" to be observed each year on the same day as the NFL Super Bowl. Rudolph Foods agreed to make charitable donations in return for online support of the campaign. Ohio Governor John Kasich issued a letter of support for Pork Rind Appreciation Day on February 6, 2012.
