= Gribenes =

Ashkenazi Jewish dish

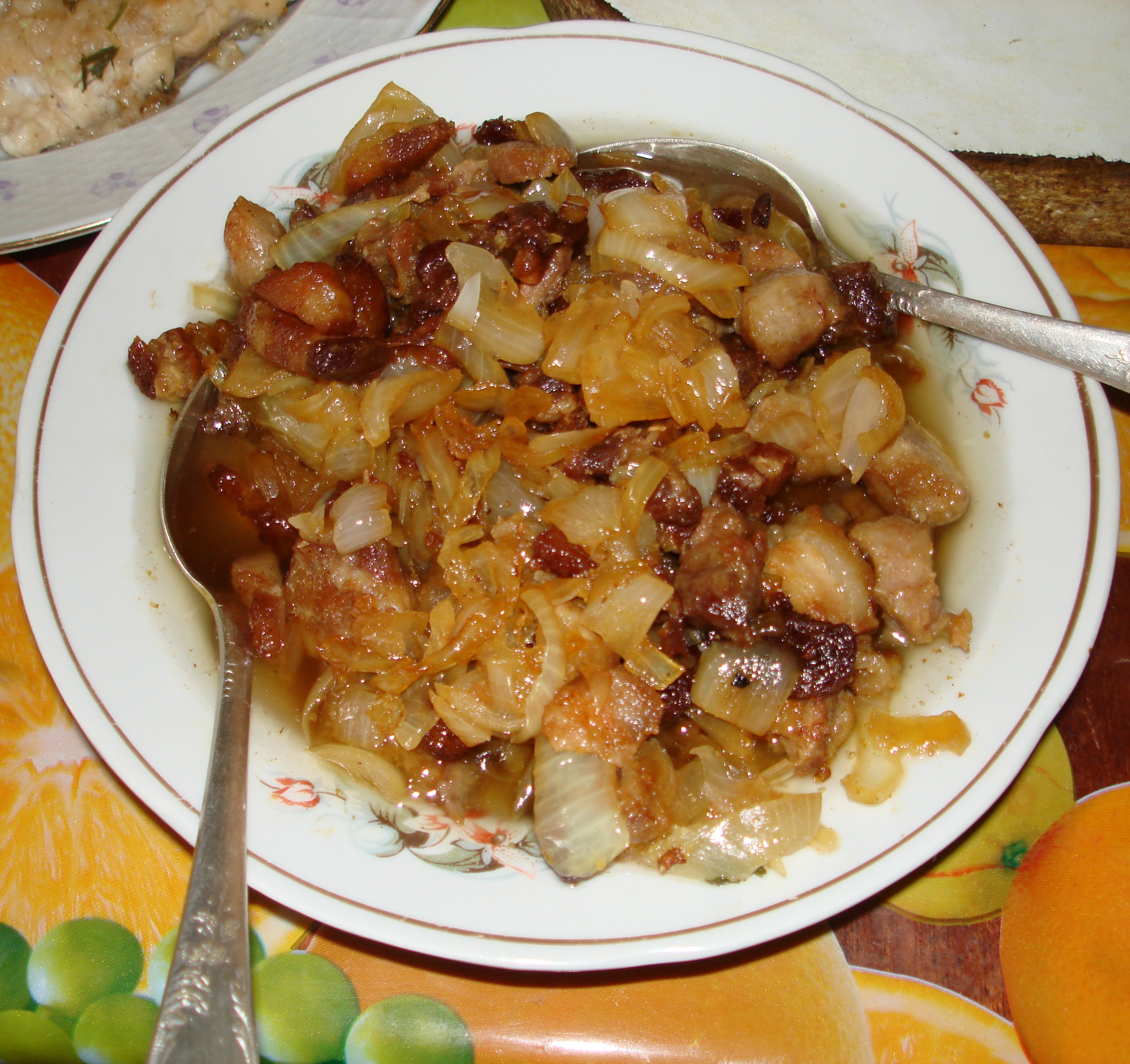
- Chicken gribenes
- Alternative names: Grieven
- Type: Snack, side dish, or garnish
- Created by: Ashkenazi Jews
- Main ingredients: Chicken or goose skin, onions

Gribenes or grieven (Yiddish: גריבענעס, romanized: ˈɡribənəs, lit. 'cracklings'; Hebrew: גלדי שומן) is a dish consisting of crisp chicken or goose skin cracklings with fried onions.

== Etymology ==
The word gribenes is related to the German Griebe (plural Grieben) meaning "piece of fat, crackling" (from the Old High German griobo via the Middle High German griebe), where Griebenschmalz is schmaltz from which the cracklings have not been removed.

== History ==
A favored food in the past among Ashkenazi Jews, gribenes appears in Jewish stories and parables, for example in the work of the Hebrew poet Chaim Nachman Bialik. As with other cracklings, gribenes are a byproduct of rendering animal fat to produce cooking fat, in this case kosher schmaltz.

Gribenes can be used as an ingredient in dishes like kasha varnishkes, fleishig kugel, and gehakte leber.

Gribenes is often associated with the Jewish holidays Hanukkah and Rosh Hashanah. Traditionally, gribenes were served with potato kugel or latkes during Hanukkah. It is also associated with Passover, because large amounts of schmaltz, with its resulting byproduct gribenes, were traditionally used in Passover recipes.

== Uses ==
Gribenes can be eaten as a snack on rye or pumpernickel bread with salt, or used in recipes such as chopped liver, or all of the above. It is often served as a side dish with pastrami on rye or hot dogs.

The dish is eaten as a midnight snack, or appetizer. In Louisiana, Jews add gribenes to jambalaya in place of (treyf) shrimp. It was served to children on challah bread as a treat. It can also be served in a GLT, a modified version of a BLT sandwich that replaces bacon with gribenes.

== See also ==
- Jewish cuisine
- List of chicken dishes
- Taillé aux greubons
- Grammeln, cvarci, and salo - similar European dishes derived from pork fat
