= Salo (food) =

Eastern European traditional cured pork

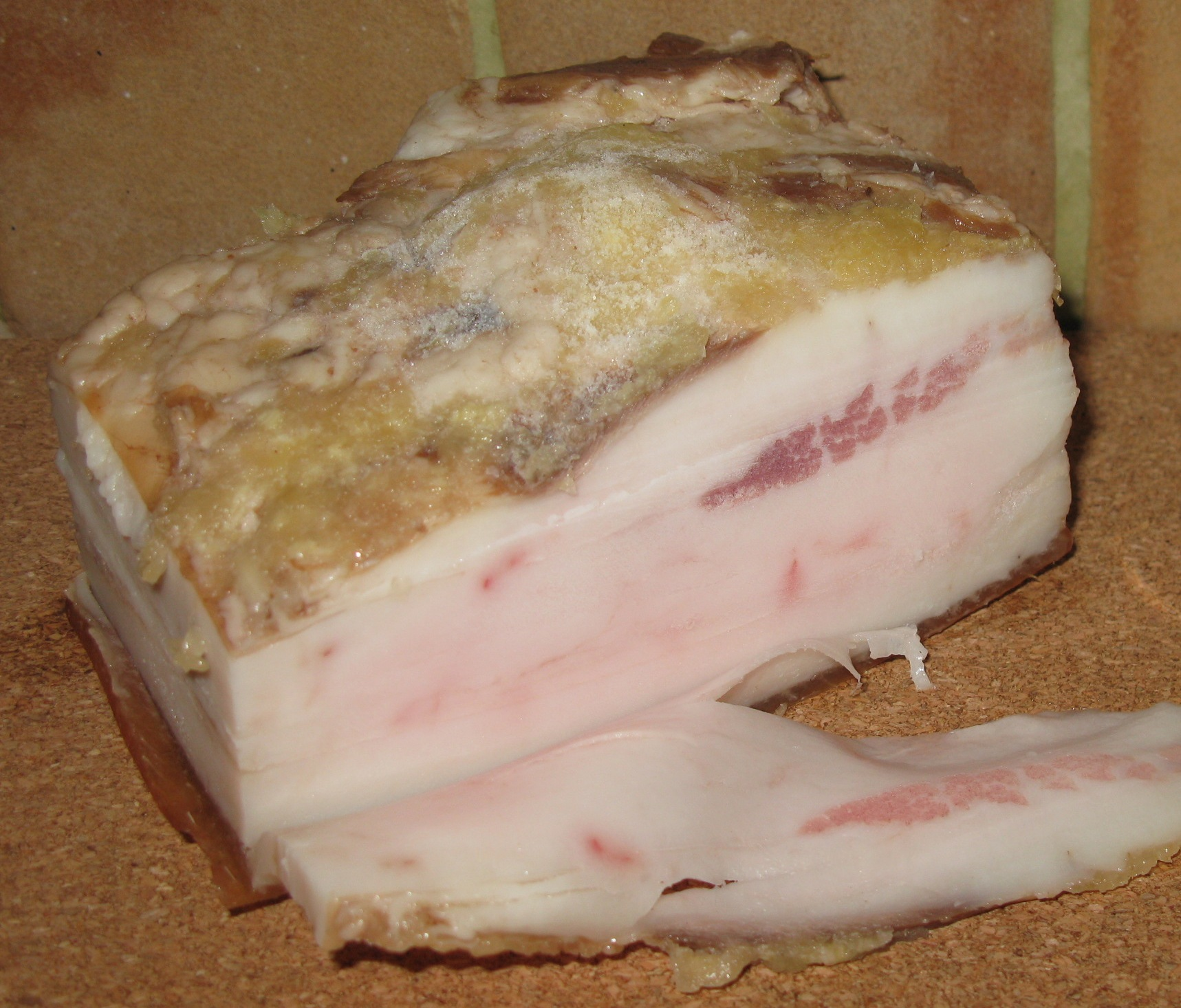
- Salo; often it has thin layers of meat
- Alternative names: Slanina, Slănină
- Region or state: Europe (Central, Southeastern, Eastern)

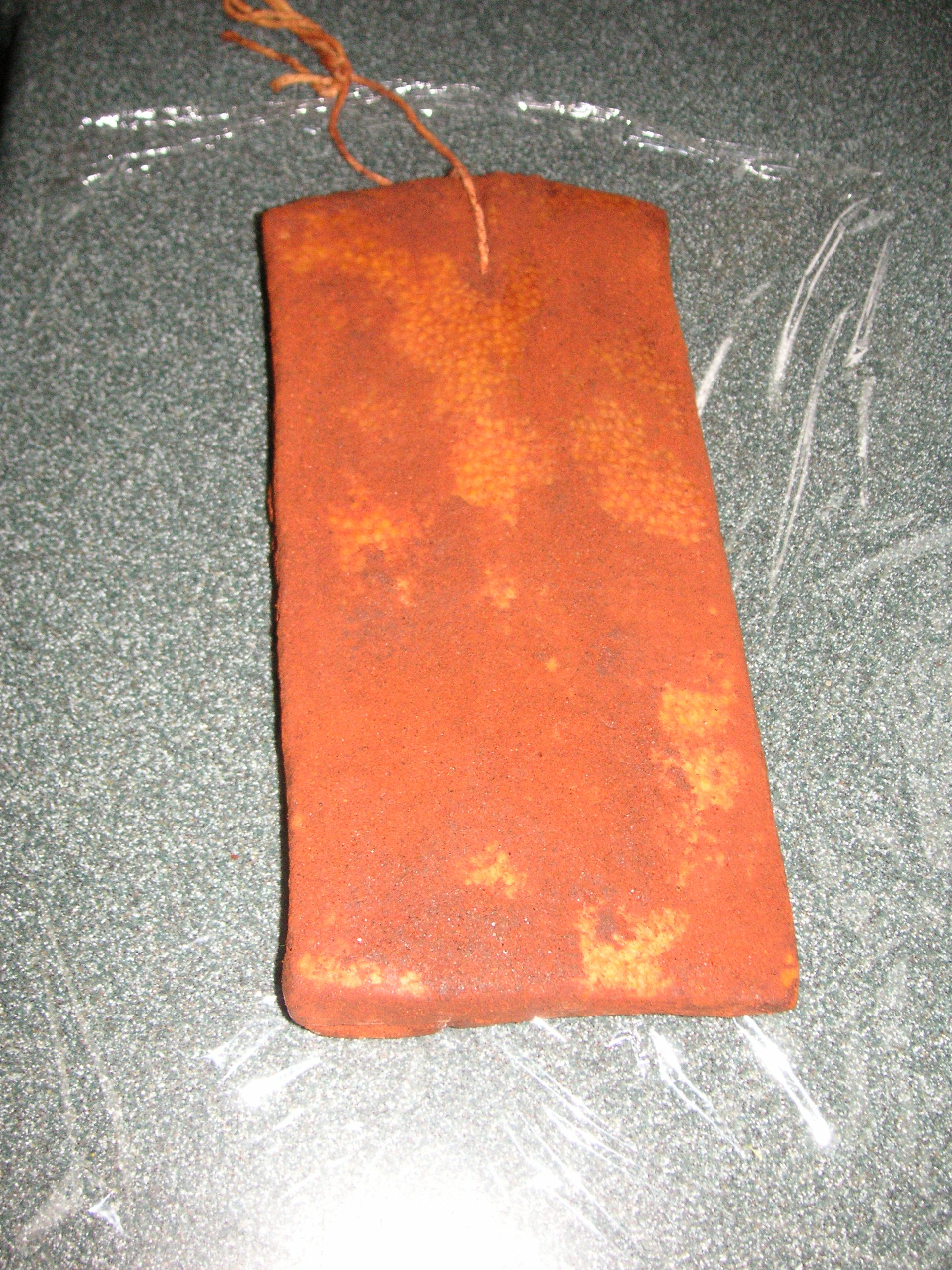
A slab of słonina aged in paprika

Salo or slanina (Note: Ukrainian: сало, romanized: salo, pronounced [ˈsɑlo]; Russian: сало, romanized: salo, pronounced [ˈsalə]; Belarusian: сала, romanized: sała; Hungarian: szalonna; Polish: słonina; Romanian: slănină; Bulgarian and Macedonian: сланина, romanized: slanina; Czech, Slovak, Serbo-Croatian and Slovene: slanina; Lithuanian: lašiniai.) (Note: The Russian, as well as Rusyn and Ukrainian cognate солонина (solonina, solonyna) is a brine-treated meat, such as corned beef.) is a European food consisting of salt-cured slabs of pork subcutaneous fat with or without skin and with or without layers of meat. It is commonly eaten and known under different names across Central, Eastern and Southeastern Europe. It is usually dry salt or brine cured. The East Slavic, Hungarian and Romanian variety may also be cured with paprika or other seasonings added, whereas the South and West Slavic version is often smoked.

The Slavic word "salo" or "slanina" as applied to this type of food is often translated to English as "bacon", "lard" or "fatback" in general, depending on context. Unlike bacon, salo contains more fat than lean meat and unlike lard, salo is not rendered. It is similar to Italian lardo, the main difference is that lardo is sliced for curing.

== History ==
Several historical factors contributed to the regional popularity of pork, and pork fat in particular: unlike cattle, which could be used as workforce, and whose meat would mostly be sold by villagers to urban inhabitants along with mutton, pigs were seen as a resource for consumption. In Ukraine, this situation could be complemented by the fact that Islamic law forbids the consumption of pork, so pigs would be the only animal which couldn't be taken by Muslim raiders. In the 18th and 19th centuries even urban inhabitants of Ukraine would keep pigs, and their pastures would sometimes be located in central parts of big cities, including Kyiv.

== Production ==
Production of salo varies between different countries and nations. For instance, among Ukrainians and Romanians a pig would not be skinned after slaughtering, but instead its skin would be scorched on a fire, the fat would be cut into slabs, and blood removed from the animal would be used to make blood sausage. This differed from the traditional way of producing salo among Poles.

== Preservation ==
For preservation, salo is salted and sometimes also smoked and aged in a dark and cold place, where it will last for a year or more. The slabs of fat are first cut into manageable pieces, typically 15×20 cm. Then layers of fat slabs (skin side down) topped with one-centimetre layers of salt go into a wooden box or barrel for curing. For added flavouring and better preservation, the slabs of salo may be covered with a thick layer of paprika (usually in the more Western lands; in Russian, salo with paprika is called "Hungarian"), minced garlic, or sometimes black pepper. In Ukrainian tradition slabs of salo would be salted and preserved in bags, barrels, etc.. In Western Ukraine salo would traditionally be smoked. Fat from intestines would be used to produce lard and a type of cracklings known as shkvarky.

== Culinary ==
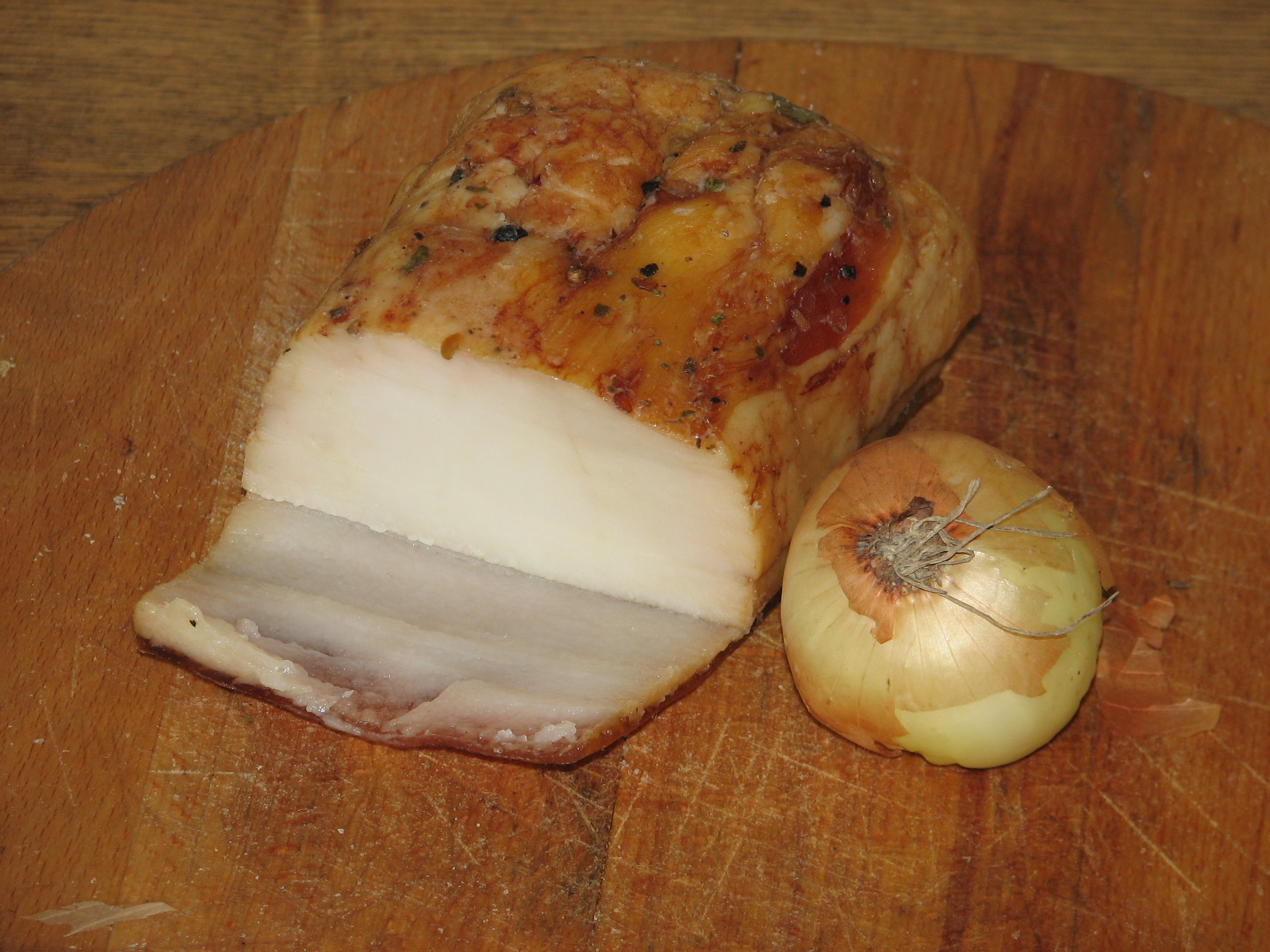
Lašiniai, a Lithuanian type of salo

Salo is consumed both cured and cooked. Salo is often chopped into small pieces and fried to render fat for cooking, while the remaining shkvarky (a type of cracklings) (Note: shkvarky in Ukrainian, shkvarki in Russian, spirgai in Lithuanian, skwarki in Polish, čvarci in Serbo-Croatian, ocvirki in Slovene, škvarky in Czech, (o)škvarky in Slovak, jumări in Romanian, kõrned in Estonian, töpörtyű in Hungarian, пръжки, джумерки in Bulgarian.) are used as condiments for fried potatoes or varenyky or spread on bread as a snack.

Romanian slănină is usually from the underbelly or the back of the pork - left with the rind/skin of the pork (which is charred and washed after slaughter), cured with salt and smoked 2 or 3 times and served with bread, polenta/mămăligă and onions; it is also used in various other dishes. Fat that is rendered and turned into lard in Romania is used to keep smoked pork sausage or fried pork meat from spoiling in a jar; lard is also used as a spread on bread with either just salt and sometimes onion or sugar. Lard is also used to make soap in Romania. Pork cracklings in Romania are jumări; they can be minced and turned into a spread - pastă de jumări. "Pomana porcului" (pig's alms/feast) is a Romanian tradition where pork meat is fried in lard right after slaugher - served with bread or polenta and sometimes pickles, it may also sometimes include smoked slănină, smoked bacon or sausage.

== Usage ==
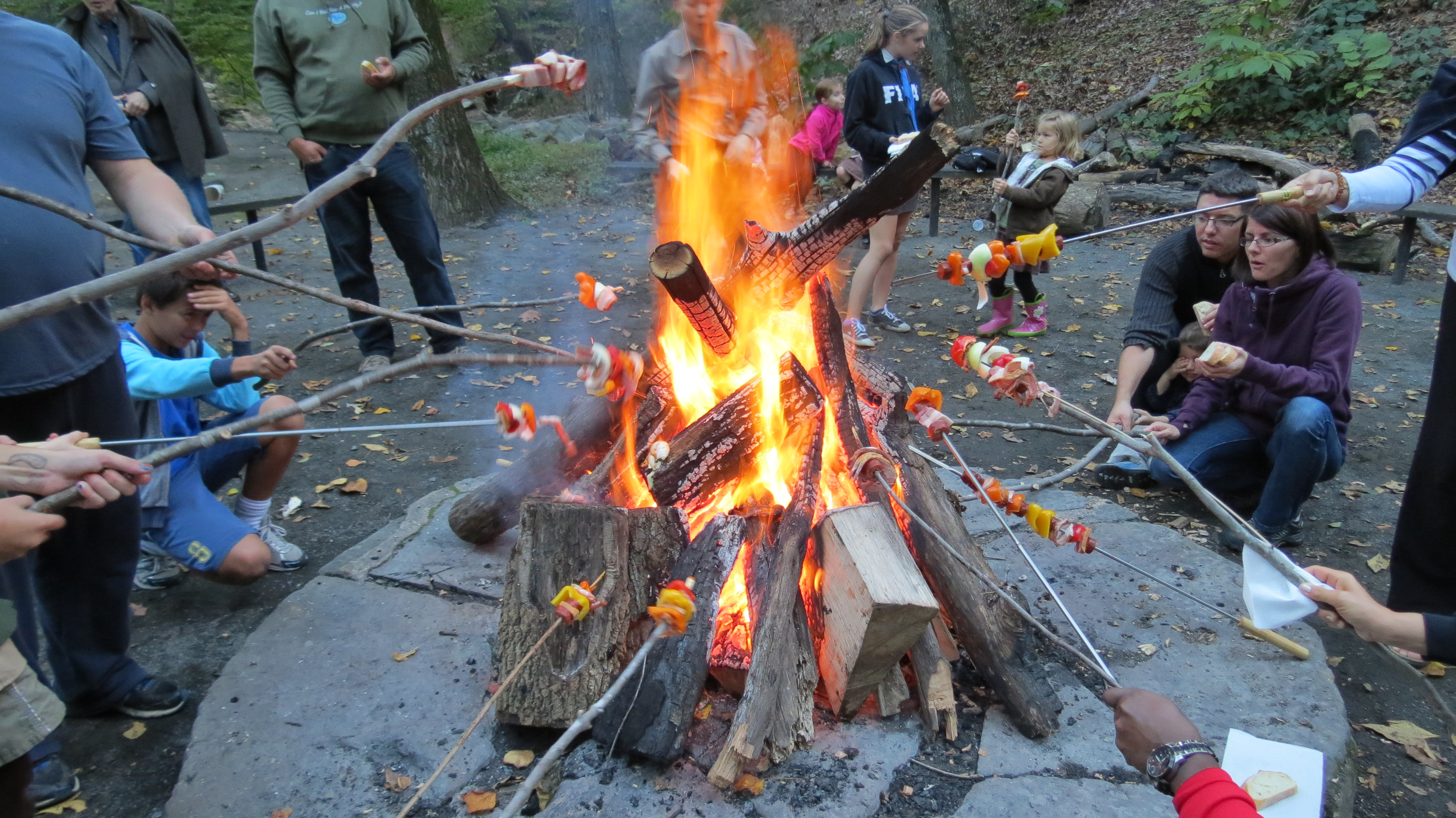
Hungarian Scouts of Washington roasting szalonna

Salted salo can be stored for a long time. It can be consumed without any preparation. For these reasons, it is often used as a food supply by shepherds, hunters, backpackers, and other travellers, and was issued to German and Hungarian soldiers as part of their rations during World War II.

When salo has been aged too long or exposed to light, the fat may oxidize on the surface and become rancid, yellow, and bitter-tasting. Though no longer fit for culinary use, the spoiled fat can be used as a water-repellent treatment for leather boots or bait for mouse traps, or it can be used to prepare homemade soap.

Belarusian, Ukrainians, and Lithuanians often eat it with rye bread and garlic or onion.

== In popular culture ==
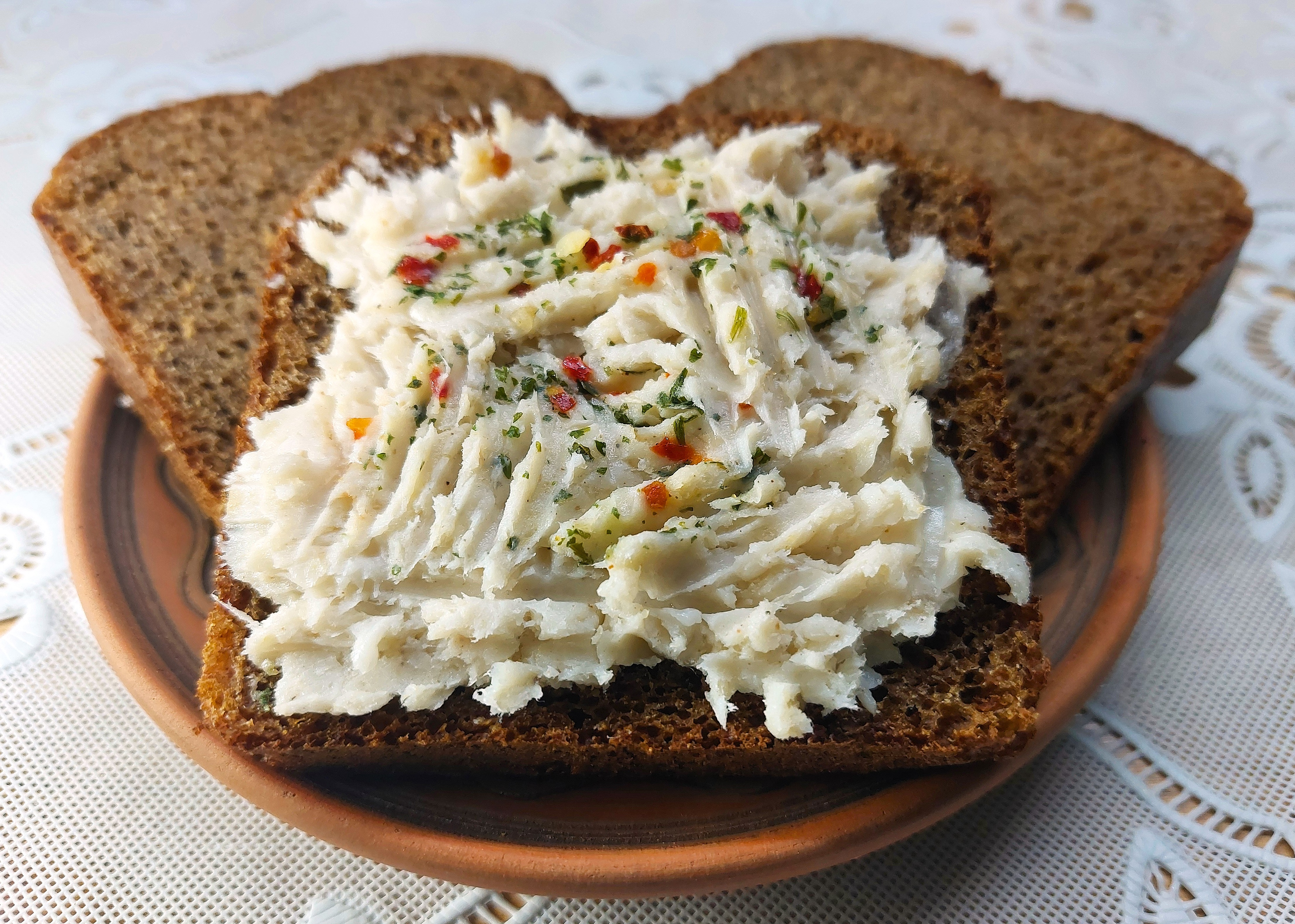
Minced salo with garlic and spices Ukraine Chernihiv region

There are many jokes which associate salo and Ukrainians. A joke about Ukrainians gave rise to a condiment, chocolate salo.

There is a Museum of Salo in Lviv, Ukraine.

On August 27, the Salo Day is informally celebrated in Ukraine.

== See also ==
- Salt pork
  - Szalonna, Hungarian salt pork
  - Lardo, Italian salt pork
- Charcuterie
