= Chocolate salo =

Ukrainian dish

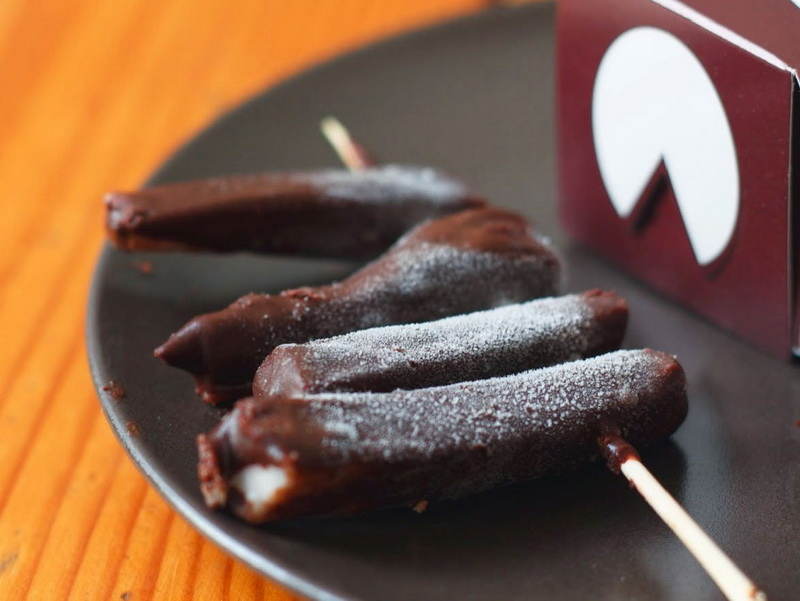
Salo in chocolate

Salo in chocolate is a Ukrainian dish, created as a joke or experiment and produced since the late 1990s.

The recipe is thought to have originated in an ethnic joke about the Ukrainians' cult-like attitude towards salo, similar to the Italians' attitude towards spaghetti.

In the late 1990s, Odesa Confectionery Factory started production of candies Salo v Shokoladi. The chocolate candies were invented as an April Fool's Day joke. They were not actually salo; they contain a regular caramel filling with a small amount of rendered fat added as a salty flavouring. Since then, the dish is available in shops and restaurants in various Ukrainian cities.

"Chocolate salo" is one of popular desserts in the restaurant of the Museum of Salo in Lviv.

A BBC reporter called it "one of the unhealthiest snacks in the world".

== See also ==
- Chocolate-covered bacon
- Snickers salad
- List of chocolate-covered foods
