= Crackling bread =

Bread flavored with cracklings

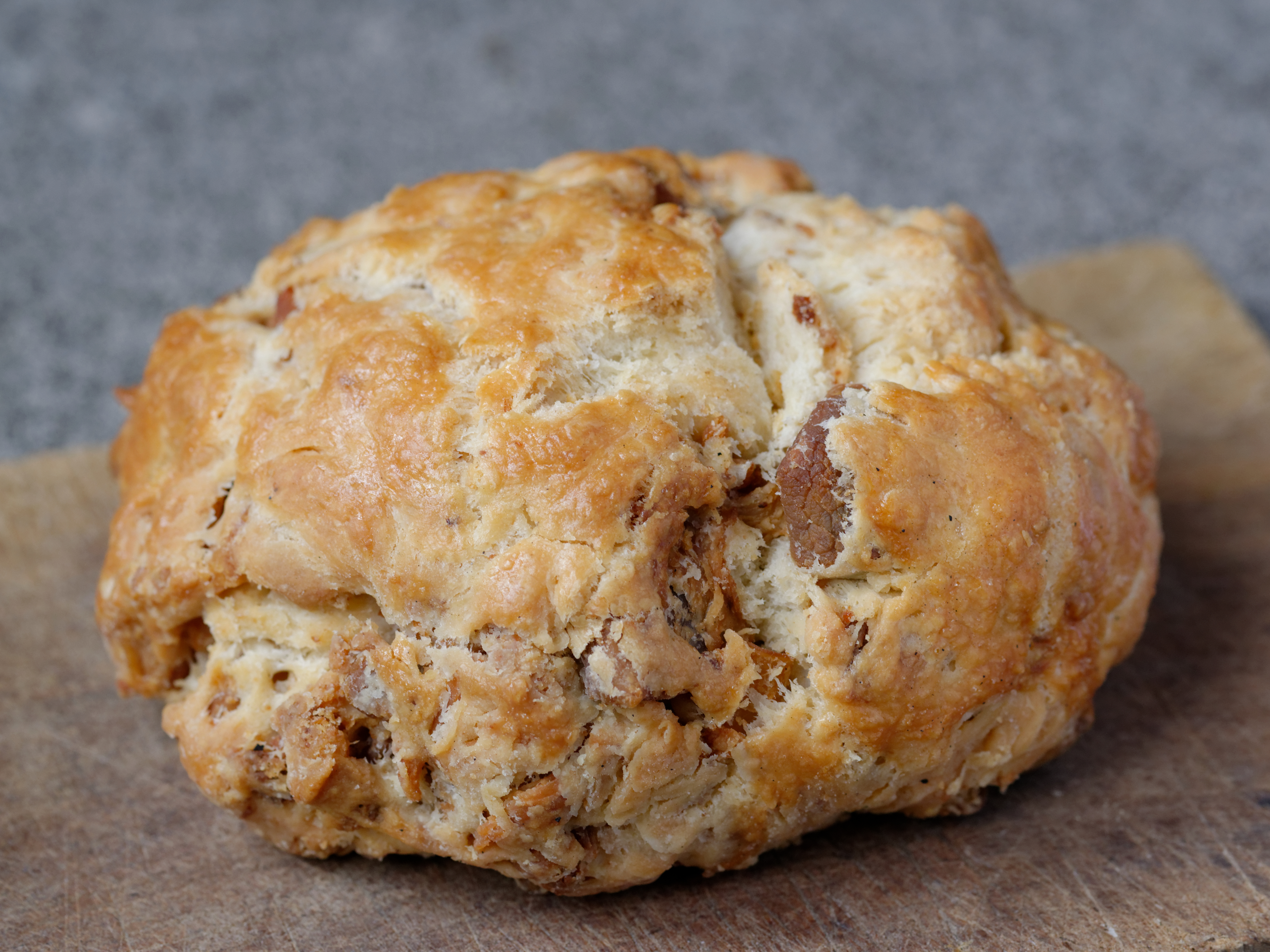
- Pompe aux grattons, a type of crackling bread from central France
- Type: Bread
- Place of origin: United States, France
- Region or state: Southern United States, Bourbonnais
- Main ingredients: Cornmeal or flour, cracklings

Bread flavored with cracklings is found in several cuisines:

- Crackling bread, in the cuisine of the Southern United States is a cornbread incorporating cracklings.
- Pompe aux grattons or brioche aux griaudes, in the cuisine of central France, is a bread, tart, or brioche incorporating cracklings. It is a specialty of the Bourbonnais.
- Pan de chicharrones, in the cuisine of Argentina and the cuisine of Uruguay, is a wheat flour bread incorporating beef cracklings and tallow.

== In American literature ==
Crackling bread is mentioned in the novel To Kill a Mockingbird. It is the narrator Scout's favorite snack. Calpurnia, the family's cook, prepared it for Scout after her first day at school. "It was not often that she made crackling bread, she said she never had time, but with both of us at school today had been an easy one for her. She knew I loved crackling bread." Calpurnia and Scout had had an argument during lunch and to try to repair the bond between them she made crackling bread.
