= Museum of Salo =

Museum in Lviv, Ukraine

The Museum of Salo is a museum dedicated to salo (cured pork fat) in Lviv, Ukraine by Liberty Avenue, 6/8. It is associated with a restaurant, where the dishes are based on salo. It capitalizes on the popular ethnic stereotype that Ukrainians are extremely fond of salo to the extent that it is considered a "national dish".

The museum and restaurant were founded by German entrepreneur and designer Boris Berger of Jewish Ukrainian origin and local sculptor Myroslav Dedyshyn. The restaurant is co-owned by Boris Berger and Mark Zarkhin.

== Salo sculptures ==
The museum features various sculptures made of lard, as well as paintings and photographs dedicated to salo. The main exhibit is the giant replica of the human heart made of salo. It is entered into the Ukrainian Book of Records. The heart is equipped with a motor to simulate its beating.Of note is also the sculpture of a humanoid alien, artist's impression of the alien from the Roswell incident ("Grey alien"). Most sculptures, created by a number of local artists are ephemeral, like ice sculptures and they are edible.

On the second floor there is a monument to salo designed by local sculptor Andrey Bytov and made of Italian marble, with an inscription in gold "Salo is salo" in several languages.

The idea of making lard sculptures was suggested to Berger by Mark Zarkhin after the marble Salo sculpture was installed. Myroslav Dedyshyn (known locally for his show and ice sculptures) made silicone molds of the first eight works, "Buddha's Hand" (a.k.a. "Che Guevara's Hand"), "Gogol's Nose", "Franz Joseph", (Note: "Franz Joseph" is the tribute to the fact that Lviv was part of Galizien lands of the Austria-Hungary empire) "Reincarnation", "She-alien", "Marilyn Monroe's Lips", "Taras Bulba" and "Uncle-nose". Sculptor Tatiana Muetdinova provided two more works: "David's Penis" and "Breast of Venus".

== Restaurant menu ==
In the restaurant you may order various salo/lard-based dishes, such as "Marilyn Monroe Lips" dessert, "penis of Michelangelo's David", "Van Gogh's Ear", or "salo sushi". Another popular dessert is "salo in chocolate", from an ethnic joke about Ukrainians. Salo sushi is rolled with onions, pickled cucumbers, potatoes, tomatoes, mustard, greens, and rye bread.

The sculptures that are made for menu dishes are made as follows: the mold is filled with molten lard, leaving some space, then the lard is hardened in a freezer. When served, the space is filled with some hot snack and served. The heat from the snack melts lard, and in 15 minutes the sculpture is gone.

Salo degustation sets include salo both produced by local farmers, as well as delivered from Italy.
