= Tostada Siberia =

Mexican regional dish

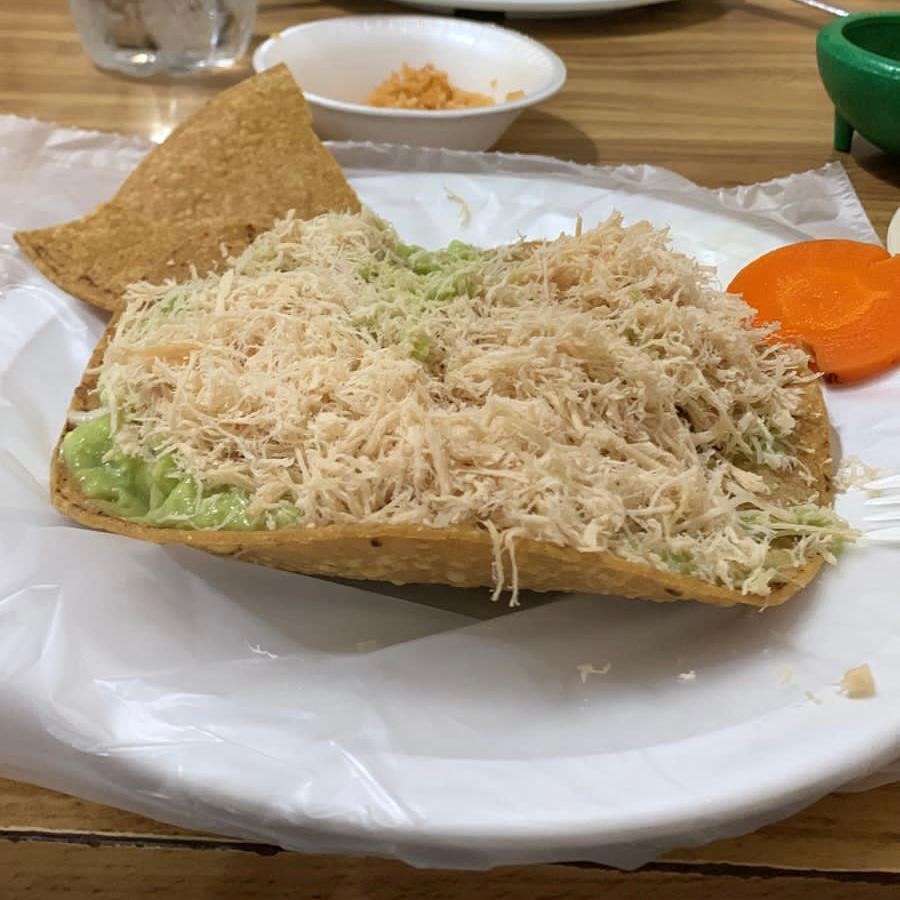
- Place of origin: Mexico
- Main ingredients: Tortillas, chicken, guacamole, custard

The Tostada Siberia is a traditional dish from the state of Nuevo León, Mexico. The dish's name comes from the business that popularized it, called "Siberia." The tostada also resembles the enormous mountains of the capital, Monterrey.

== Origin ==
Demetrio and Francisco Téllez, two chefs originally from Puebla, founded "La Siberia del Norte" as a food stand located at 1029 Colegio Civil Street North, in downtown Monterrey. The dish was designed for those passing by on their way to the bus station, who needed a quick bite to eat and enough to continue their journey.

== Variants ==
A different version was created at this restaurant, which featured pork instead of chicken, and was served only on weekends. This version is still on the restaurant's menu. There's also a taco version, in which the tortilla is simply dipped in oil and rolled with the same filling.

=== Ingredients ===
It consists of guacamole made with avocado and green guaje tomato, to which jalapeño vinegar is added, along with shredded chicken breast or leg and sour cream, all sandwiched between two large corn tortillas. It is often accompanied by pickled chilies and carrots.
