= Cracklings =

Material that remains after rendering animal fat and skin

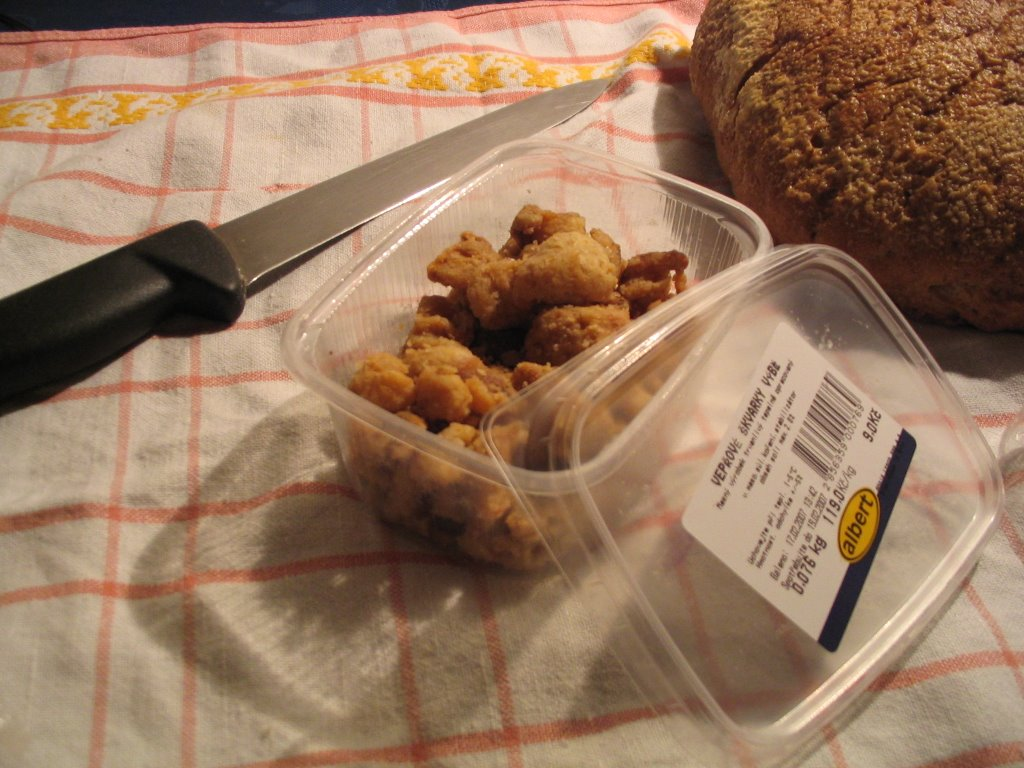
Čvarci in Serbian

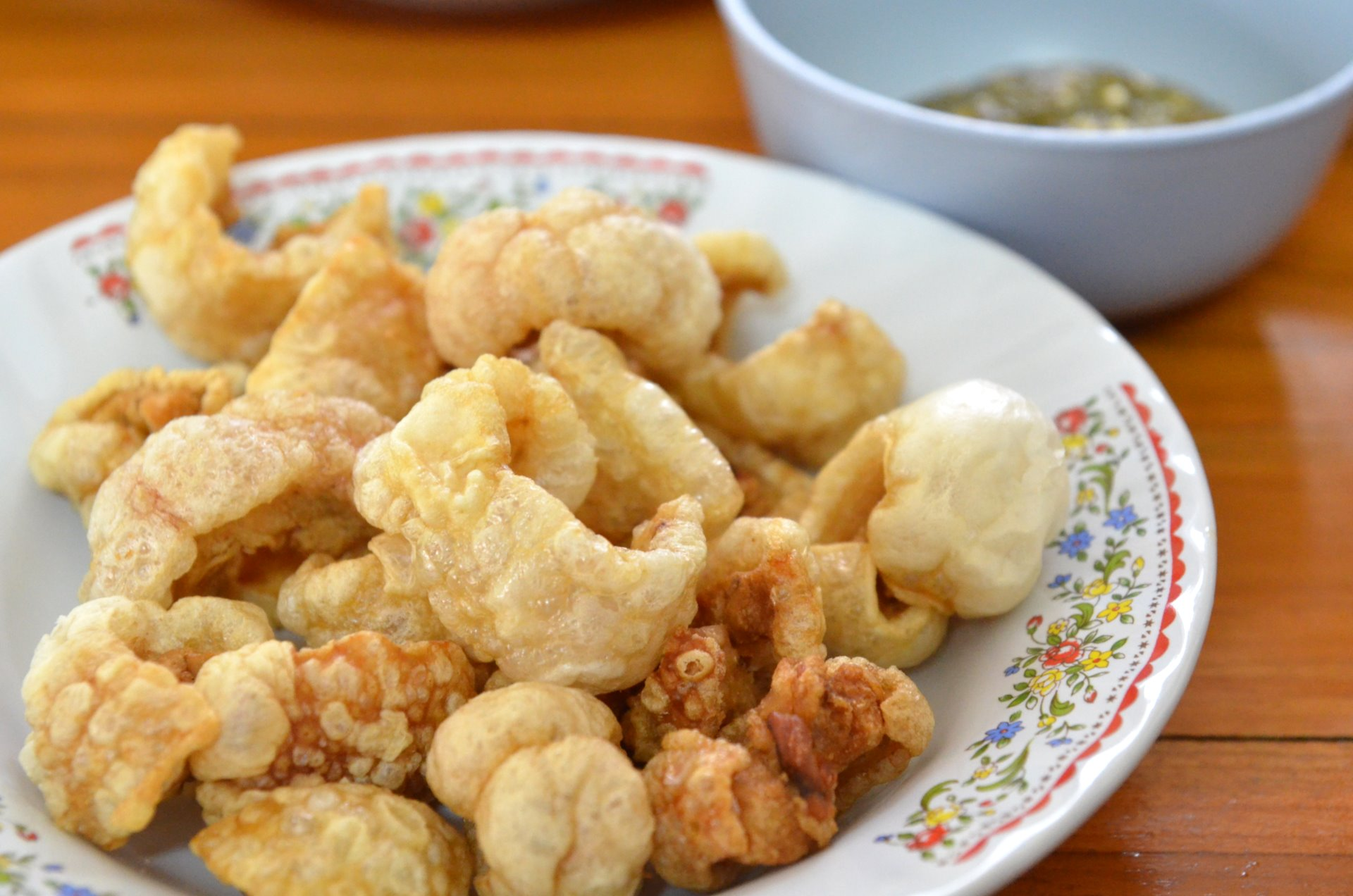
A bowl of pork rinds in Thailand

Cracklings (American English), crackling (British English), also known as scratchings, are the solid material that remains after rendering animal fat and skin to produce lard, tallow, or schmaltz, or as the result of roasting meat. It is often eaten as a snack food or made into animal feed. It is also used in cooking.

Cracklings are most commonly made from pork, goose, and chicken, but are also made from other poultry and from beef, lamb and mutton.

== Sources of cracklings ==
=== French cuisine ===
In French cuisine, cracklings (grillons, grattons, gratterons, frittons) may be made from pork, goose, duck or turkey. These are salted while hot and eaten as an hors-d'œuvre, especially in the southwest. Duck 'frittons' are said to come originally from Burgundy.

=== Pork ===
Pig skin made into cracklings are a popular ingredient worldwide: in the British, Central European, Danish, Quebecois (oreilles de crisse), Latin American and Spanish (chicharrones), East Asian, Southeast Asian, Southern United States, and Cajun (grattons) cuisines. They are often eaten as snacks. In Hungary, they are popular as a breakfast or dinner food.

Rendered pork fat (salo) produces a type of cracklings known as Čvarci (and other names). (Note: shkvarky in Ukrainian, shkvarki in Russian, spirgai in Lithuanian, skwarki in Polish, čvarci in Serbo-Croatian, ocvirki in Slovene, škvarky in Czech, (o)škvarky in Slovak, jumări in Romanian, kõrned in Estonian, töpörtyű in Hungarian, пръжки, джумерки in Bulgarian.)

=== Beef ===
Krupuk kulit is an Indonesian cracker (krupuk) made of beef skin. In Argentina and Uruguay cracklings extracted from tallow are called chicharrones and are a common filling for traditional breads.

=== Poultry ===
Goose cracklings are popular in Central European cuisine.

Chicken and goose cracklings are popular in Ashkenazi Jewish cuisine, and are called gribenes (cf. German Griebe below).

In Hungarian cuisine, goose cracklings are favored.

=== Lamb and mutton ===
Cracklings from fat-tailed sheep were until recently a popular ingredient in Persian cuisine.

== Uses ==
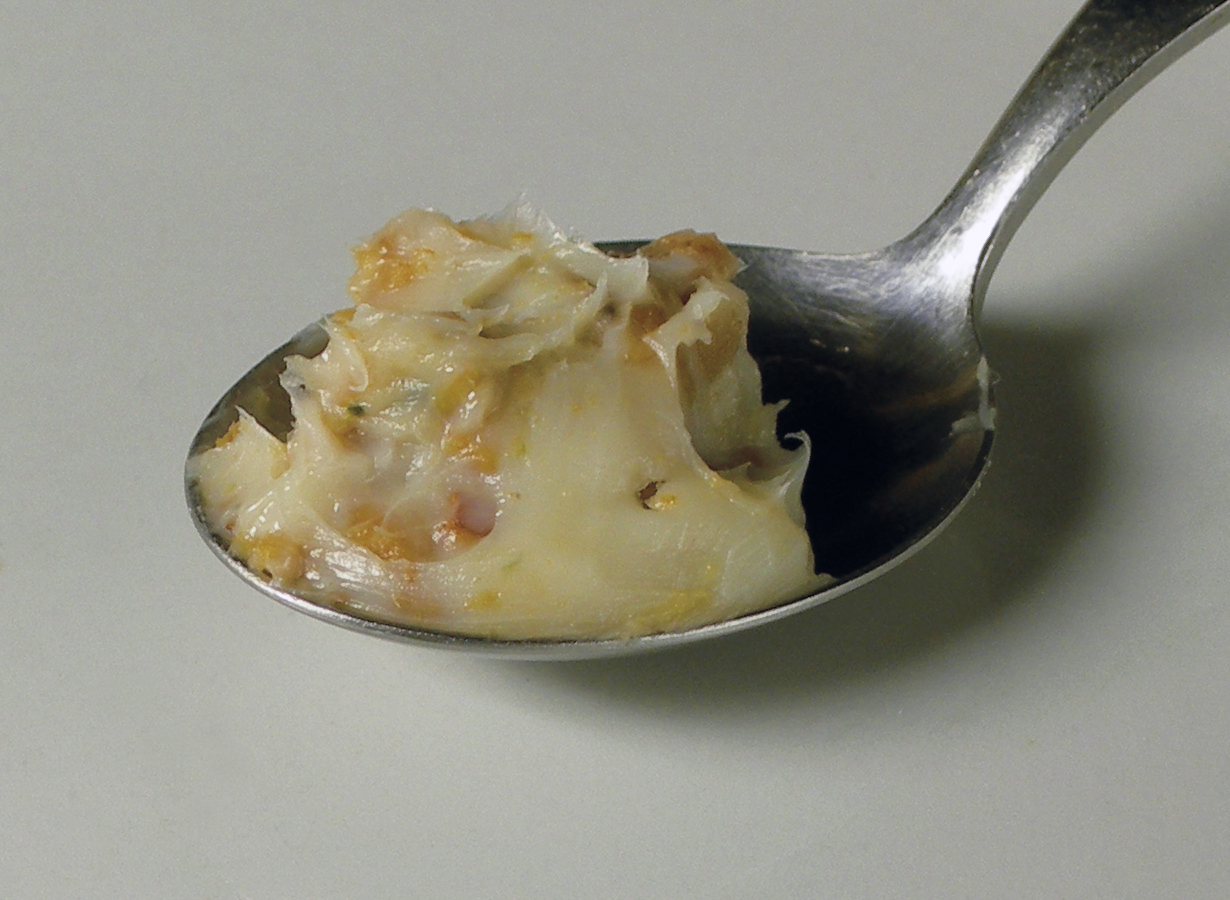
Lard with cracklings

Modern recipes sometimes substitute crumbled cooked bacon.

In Italian cuisine, cracklings are commonly home-made by families engaged in raising pigs as livestock. Cracklings are used to enrich a wide variety of foods, from soups to desserts.

In German cuisine and Polish cuisine, cracklings of pork or goose (Grieben) are often added to lard (Schmalz) when it is used as a bread spread.

Crackling is often added to doughs and batters to make crackling bread (French pompe aux grattons), crackling biscuits (Hungarian tepertős pogácsa), or potato pancakes (oladyi).

Salted cracklings are widely used as a snack food.

Cracklings have been used as a supplement to various kinds of animal feed, including for poultry, dogs, and pigs.
