= Chicharrón de la Ramos =

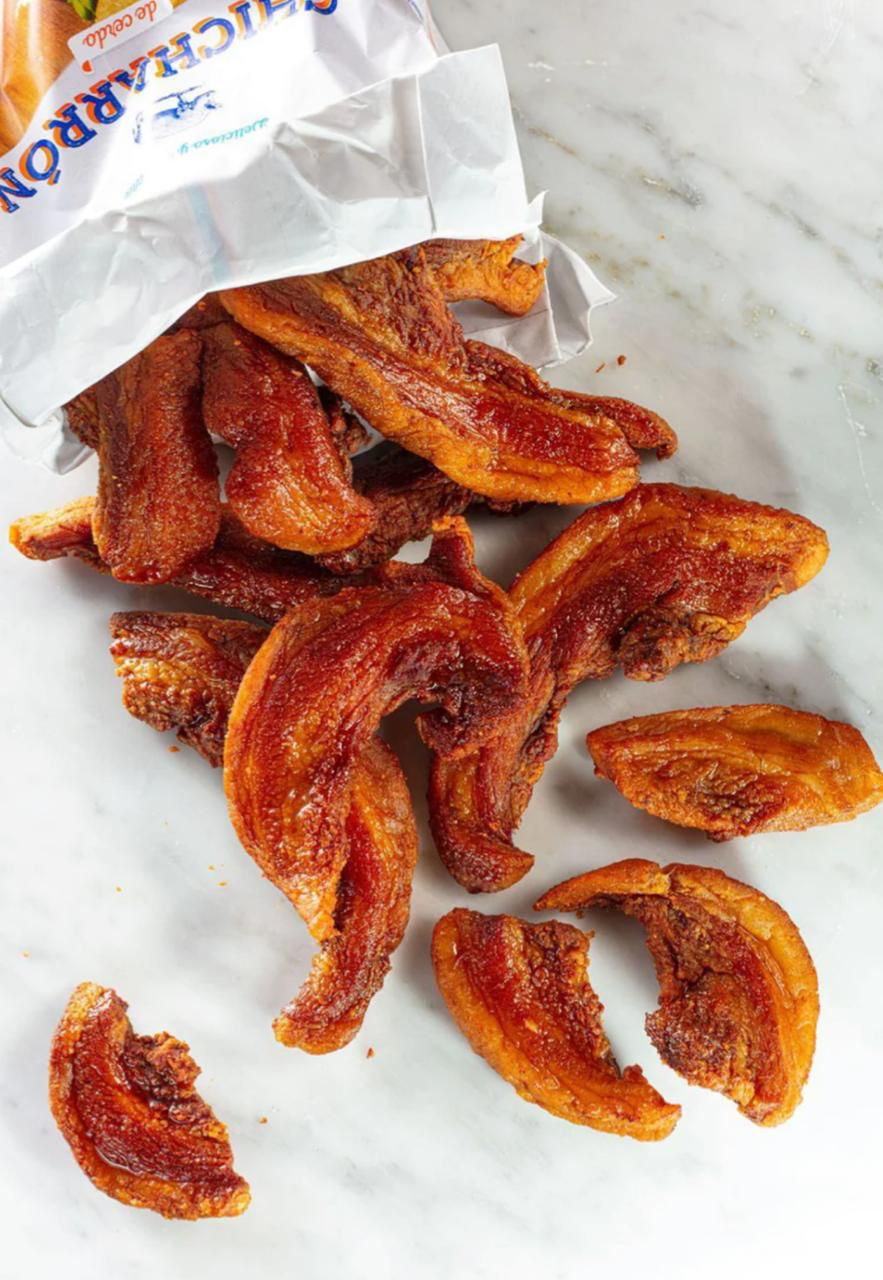
- Place of origin: Mexico
- Main ingredients: Pork chin, lard and spices

The Chicharrón de la Ramos or Chicharrón Regio, is a local variation of the traditional Mexican chicharrón originating in Monterrey, Nuevo León, although the local version differs in its seasoning process after pressing. The pork rind comes from the pork chin (chin) and is fried in lard, which is then seasoned with herbs or salt, giving the dish its reddish color.

This dish is part of the culinary culture of Nuevo León, as it is prepared in a way that is unlike its variations in other states of Mexico.

== Origins ==
This type of chicharrón is believed to have originated between the 1970s and 1980s. However, little is known about its exact origins or the people involved in the creation of this variety. Monterrey is a metropolis known for its wide culinary diversity, primarily encompassing foods of animal origin; Chicharrón is included within this cuisine. The name of this variant is due to the butcher shop named Carnes Ramos, which is a popular consumer company originally from the city, and is one of the traditional dishes.

== Local culture ==
This preparation is part of the Regiomontano culinary culture and heritage, along with many other dishes such as wood-cooked goat, roast pork, machacado, and carne asada.

== Dishes with "Chicharrón Regio" ==
Chicharrón Regio can be served in different ways, including tacos, gorditas, tortas, egg, discada, pizza or bocoles.
