= Čvarci =

Southeastern European pork rind

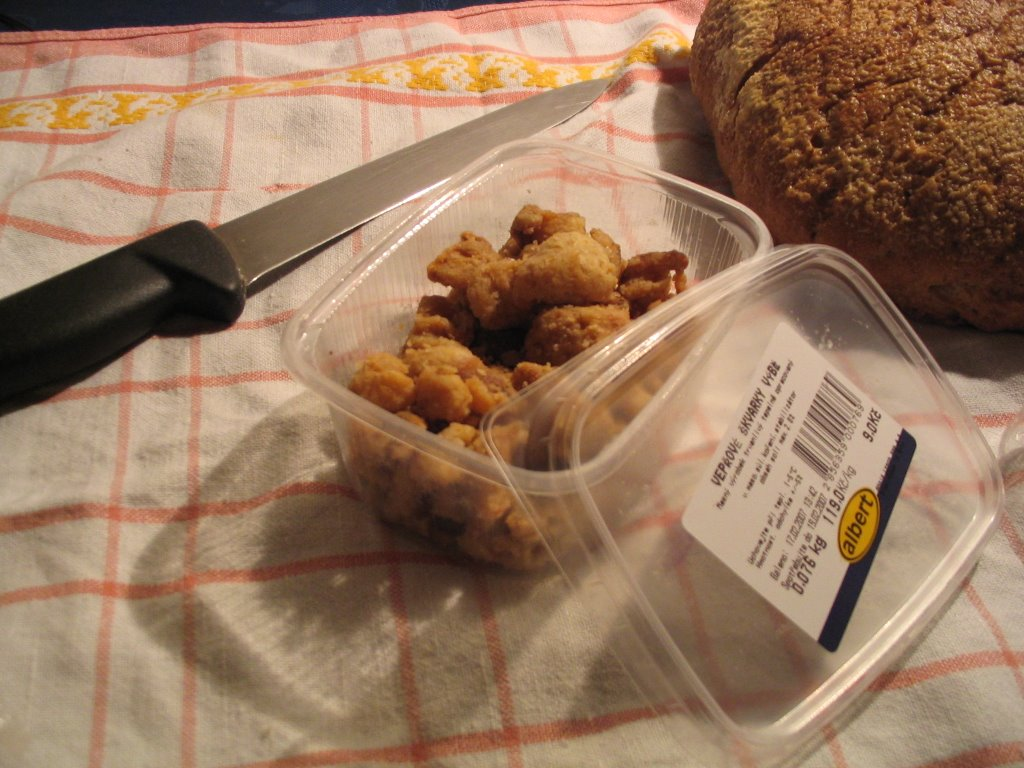
Čvarci

Čvarci (sing.: čvarak, Croatian: čvarci, Serbian Cyrillic: чварци / чварак, pronounced [t͡ʃʋǎːrt͜si], [t͡ʃʋǎːrak], Slovene: ocvirki, Romanian: jumări, Polish: skwarki, Czech: škvarky, Slovak: škvarky, oškvarky, German: Grieben, Austrian German: Grammeln, Russian: шкварки, romanized: shkvarki, Ukrainian: шкварки, romanized: shkvarky, Belarusian: шкваркі, romanized: škvarki, Hungarian: tepertő, töpörtyű, Macedonian: чварки/џимиринки, Bulgarian: пръжки, romanized: prazhki) is a type of food in Central and Southeastern Europe, a variant of cracklings. Unlike pork rinds, čvarak is not the intended product of its preparation, but a by-product created during the preparation of lard, cracklings left over when pig lard is melted down, and the fat is thermally separated from other tissue.

Typical pigs in this region will have several inches of fat between the skin and the first layer of muscle, which is the bacon. This fat is trimmed and melted down. The liquid fat is strained through a cheesecloth and cools into solid lard. The strained by-product composed mostly of skin and non-soluble fatty tissue is what čvarci is.

Once strained from the fat, they're salted. Čvarci are by no means a "common" food - very much like the Scottish haggis, it has its fans and its haters, but wherever it exists, it is fairly controversial, with many pointing out how unhealthy it is. It can be found in Serbia, Bosnia, continental Croatia, Slovenia, Romania, Bulgaria and North Macedonia. They can also be found in other countries throughout Central and Eastern Europe: in Poland, Czech Republic, Slovakia, Austria, Hungary, Ukraine and Belarus. They are usually homemade, with industrial production not as pronounced. In larger cities they can be obtained on farmer markets or in supermarkets.

== Preparation ==
Preparation of čvarci involves melting the lard. Lard is cut in blocks of about 1 inch (2.5 cm) in size and slowly fried in their own fat. Milk may be added at this point in order to obtain caramel colour. Process lasts until all fat melts away and only a kind of tough crispy pork rind remains. Onion or garlic may be added as a spice and salt is always used as a condiment. Pieces of skin may or may not be attached. In most common varieties of čvarci, some percentage of pork fat remains.

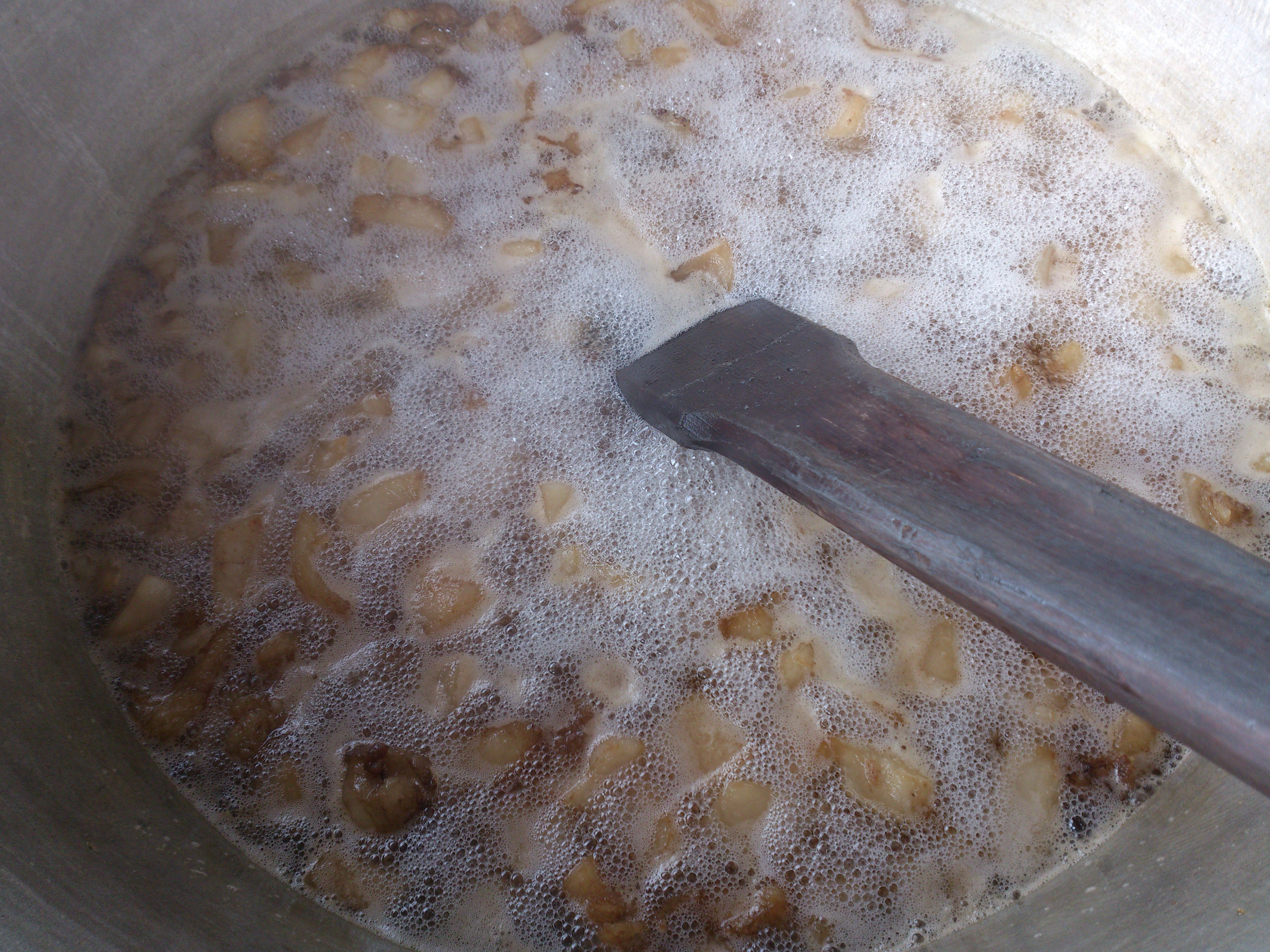
Cooking

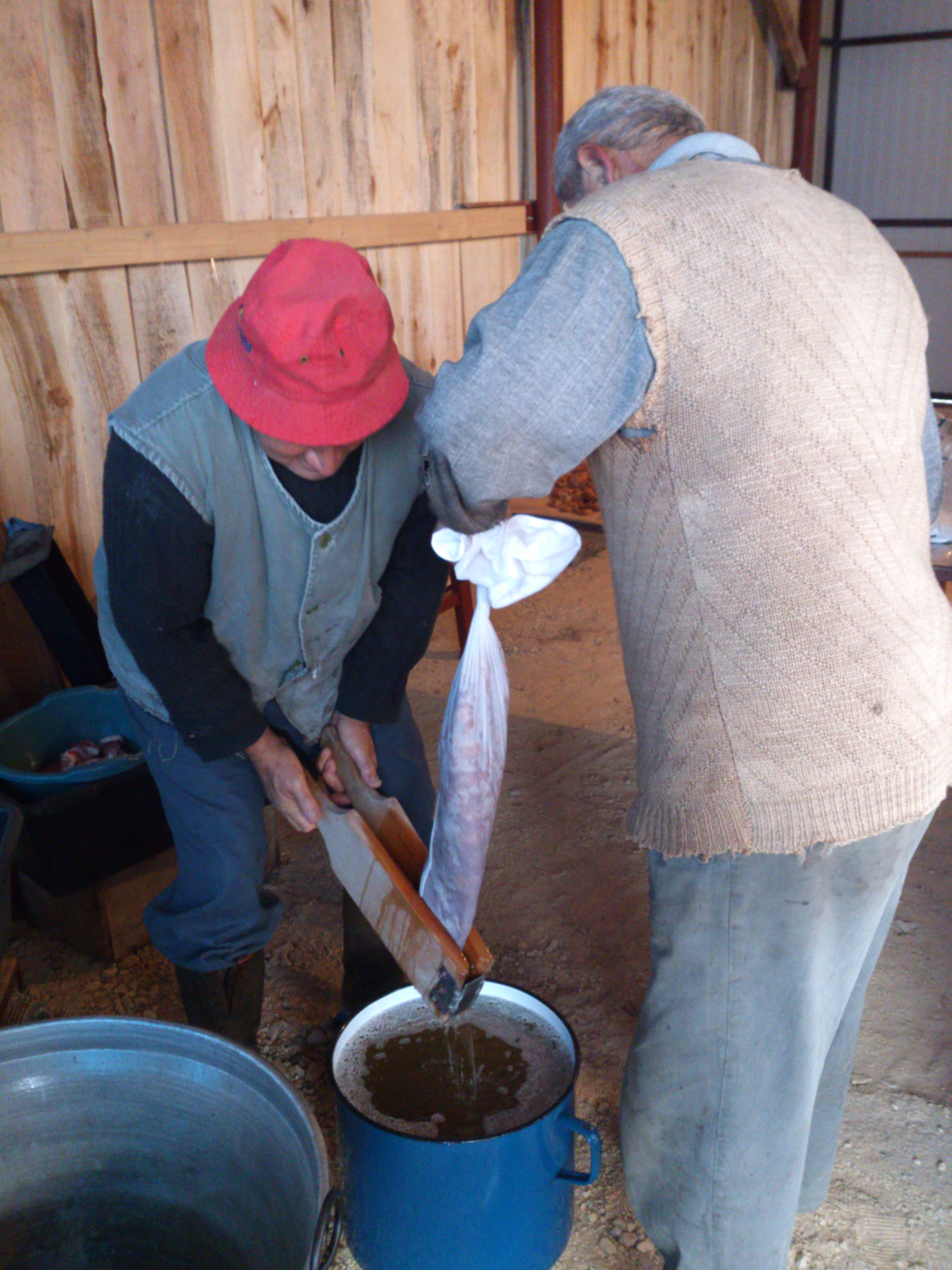
Squeezing

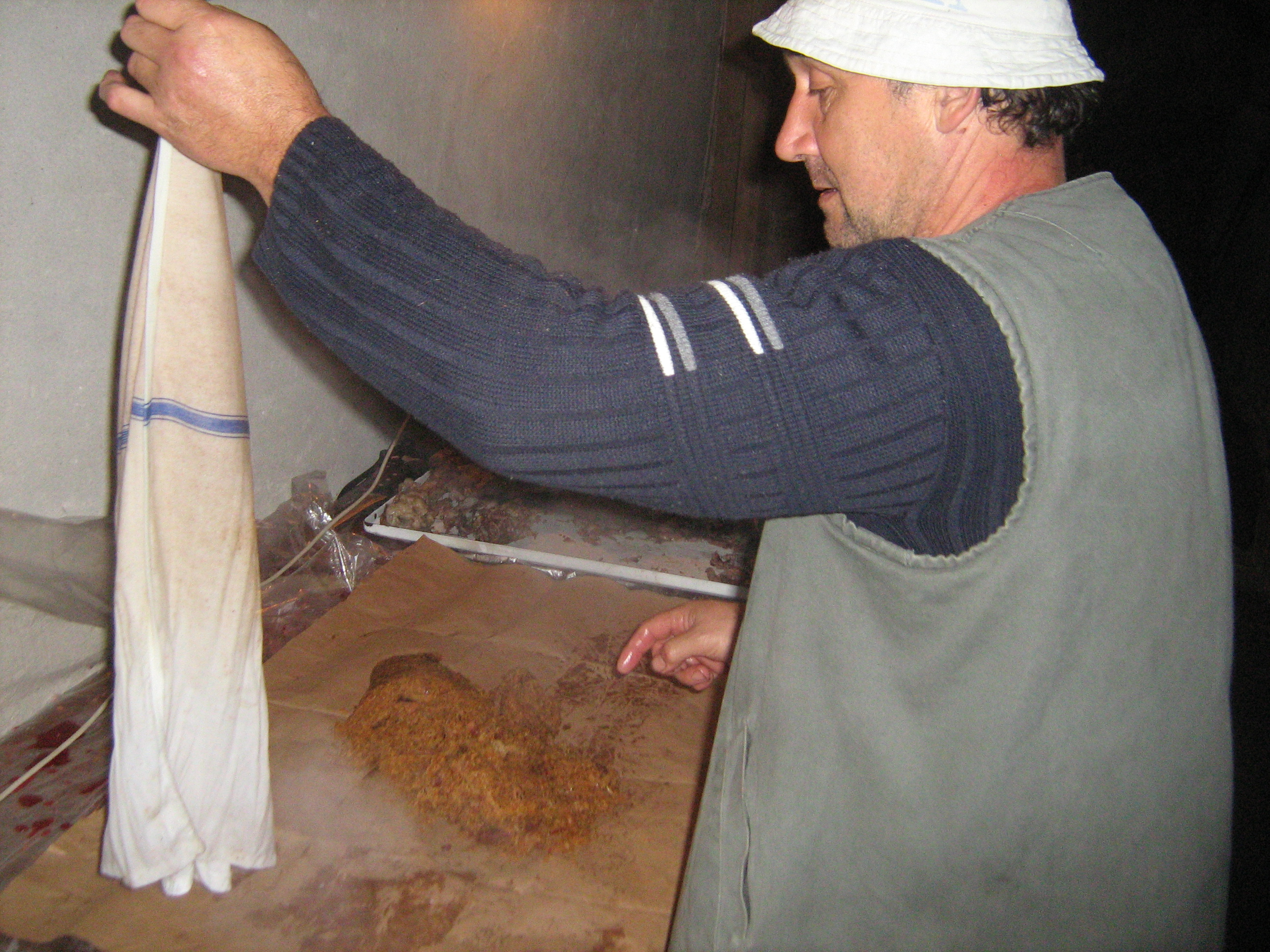
After squeezing

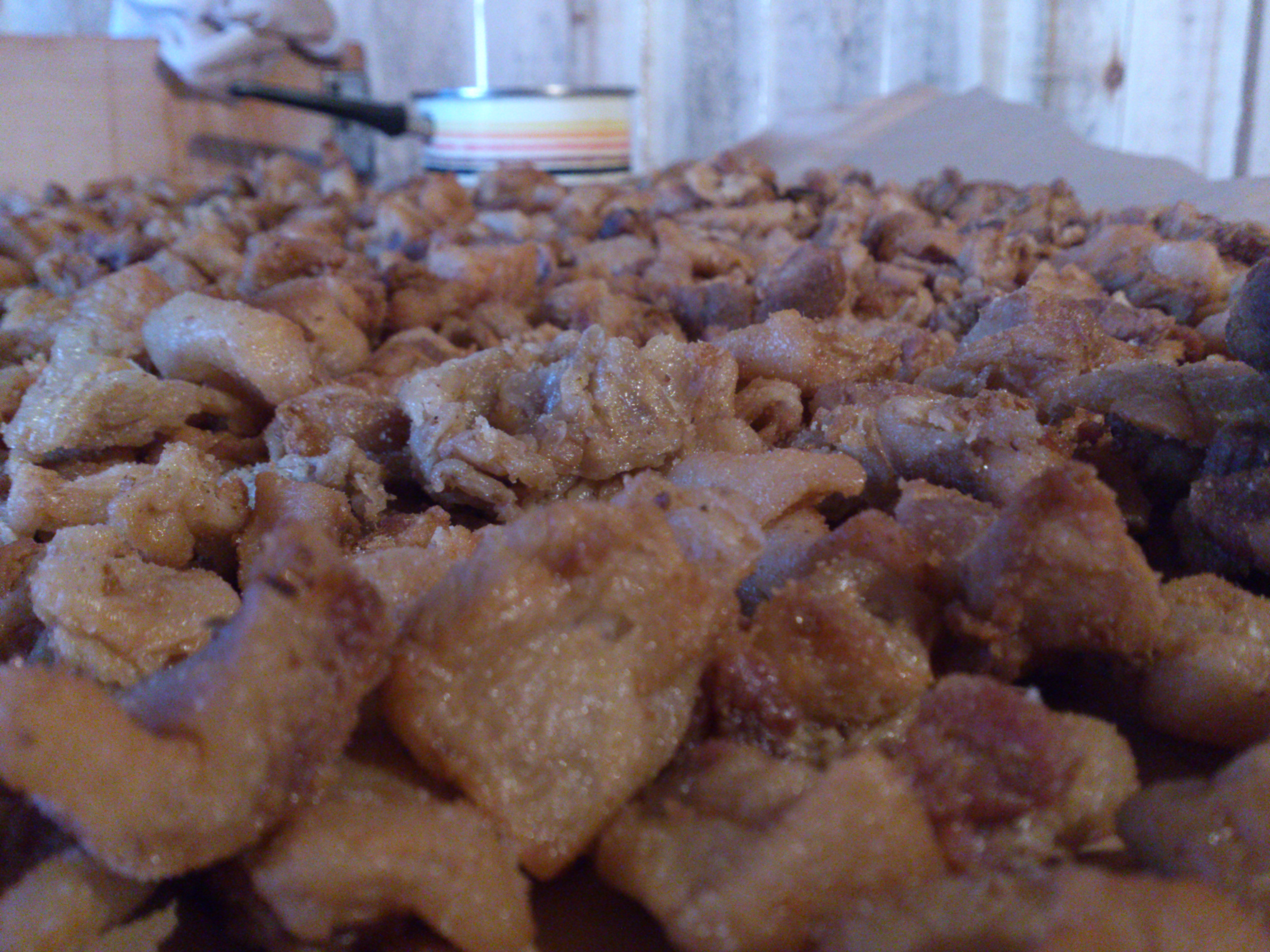
Final product

== Duvan čvarci ==
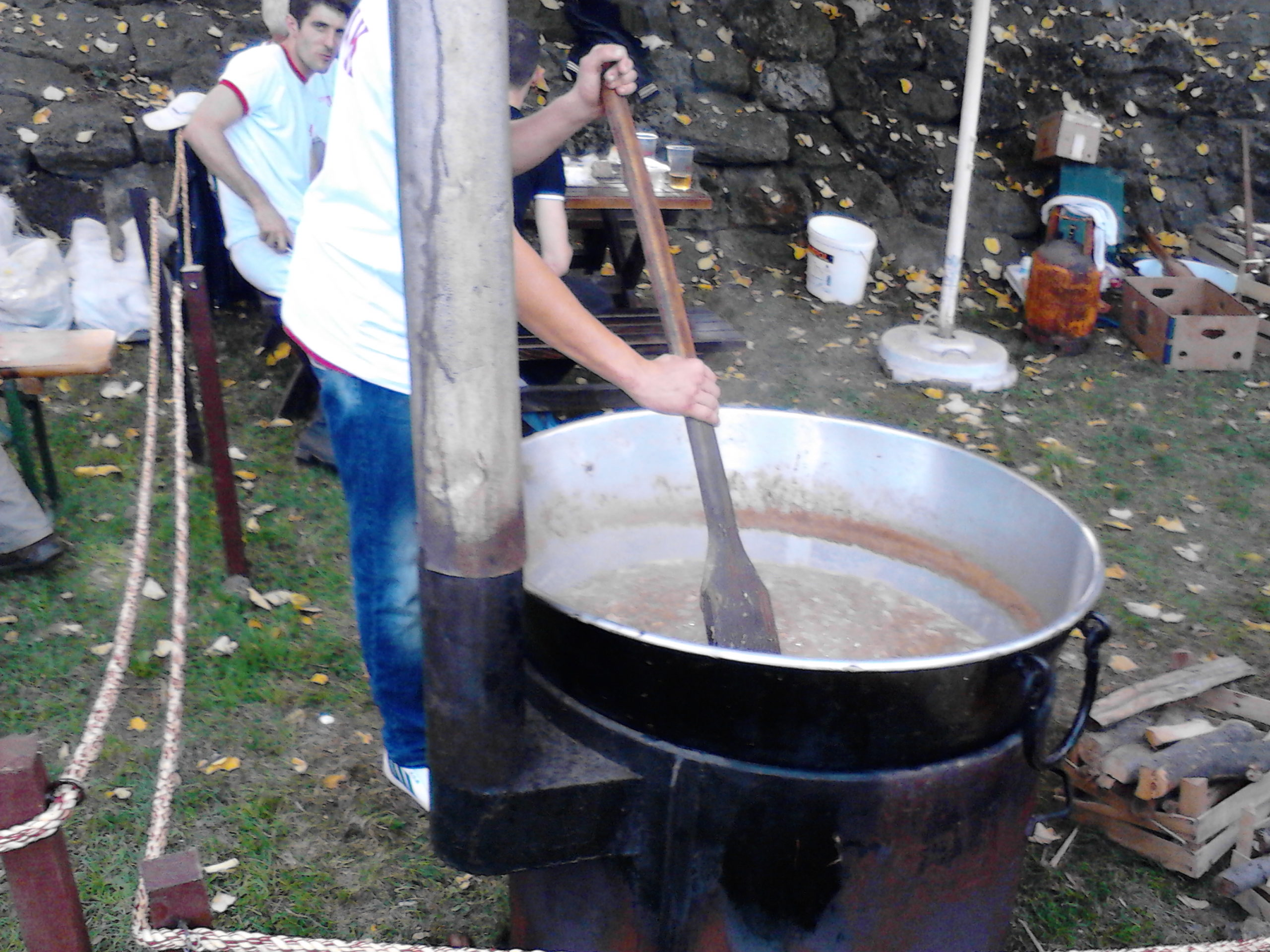
Preparative of duvan čvarci in Valjevo, Serbia

A special variety of čvarci known as duvan čvarci are mostly produced in the Western Serbia region and especially around the town of Valjevo. In case of duvan čvarci, the process of slow fat frying/cooking is prolonged until all the fat has been extracted. The remainder is a mass of delicate fibers which resembles finely chopped tobacco, thus giving the name to the variety: duvan is a Serbian word for tobacco. Indications for duvan čvarci had been registered and protected in the Serbian intellectual property office by Slavoljub Batoćanin.

A similar process is used to the same effect in Hrvatsko Zagorje, where čvarci are pressed in a potato press to achieve faster fat extraction.

== Consumption ==
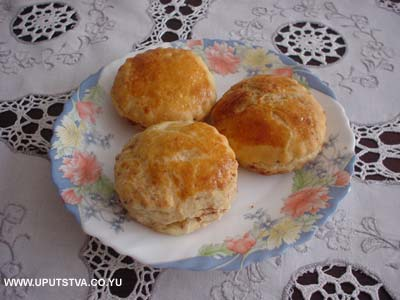
Pogačice sa čvarcima, a pastry made with čvarci

As with most traditional pork products, they are considered to be winter food. Traditional time for pork processing in the Balkans is late autumn, and čvarci are consumed throughout the winter. They can be eaten on their own as a snack, served with heated fruit brandy common to the same region, called rakija, or they can be used as an ingredient in other food recipes (such as proja baked with čvarci). In Croatia, they are most often eaten with bread and onions. If consumed as a snack, they are very often combined with beer.

Recipes with čvarci include various sorts of pastry.

== See also ==
- Chicharrón
- Gribenes
- Pig slaughter
- Pork rind
- Rousong
