= List of bacon dishes =

The following is a list of bacon dishes. The word bacon is derived from the Old French word bacon, and cognate with the Old High German bacho, meaning "buttock", "ham", or "side of bacon". Bacon is made from the sides, belly, or back of the pig and contains varying amounts of fat depending on the cut. It is cured and smoked over wood cut from apple trees, mesquite trees, or hickory trees. Bacon is used as an ingredient or condiment in a number of dishes.

== Bacon dishes ==
Name	Image	Origin	Description
Æbleflæsk		Denmark	Æbleflæsk is a traditional dish in Danish cuisine. The dish made of bacon, onions, apples, and sugar served on rugbrød.
Angels on horseback			Angels on horseback is a dish created by wrapping oysters in bacon and placing them on a skewer. The skewered pieces are then dusted with cayenne pepper and broiled until the bacon becomes crisp.
Bacon and cabbage		Ireland	Bacon and cabbage is a traditional Irish dish. It is created by boiling shoulder or collar bacon in a saucepan, and 20 minutes before the bacon is finished cooking, chopped cabbage is added to the water. It is then sometimes covered with parsley sauce or mustard sauce made from some of the used cooking liquid.
Bacon and egg pie		England	Bacon and egg pie is made by rolling out a pastry in a pie dish and filling it with chopped hard-boiled eggs, crushed bacon, and small amounts of salt and milled black pepper. An egg-milk mixture is then poured into the pie, and another layer of pastry is added on top.
Bacon and eggs (full breakfast)			The full breakfast of bacon and eggs is a traditional food in England, US, Canada, and Ireland. Side dishes can include: black pudding, white pudding, sausage, toast or fried bread, baked beans, hash browns, pancakes, and cheese. A study at the University of Alabama found that eating a breakfast of bacon and eggs may be the healthiest way to start the day because it programs the body's metabolism to burn more calories.
Bacon bits			Real bacon bits are made from bacon that has been cooked, then dried, then crushed into small pieces. Imitation bacon bits are fashioned from textured vegetable protein. Bacon bits are commonly used as a topping or garnish, and they can be incorporated into foods as an ingredient.
Bacon cake			Sweet or savory cake made with bacon.
Bacon, egg and cheese sandwich			A bacon, egg, and cheese sandwich can be made in several ways. One way involves using a sliced bagel, a couple of slices of bacon, and a fried egg layered into sandwich form. Another way uses a crescent roll instead of a bagel.
Bacon explosion		United States	The recipe for bacon explosion was released onto BBQ Addicts blog on December 23, 2008. It was instantly popular, generating 500,000 hits to the blog. Bacon explosion is made by weaving thick-cut bacon into a lattice, spreading a layer of italian sausage on the lattice, and sprinkling crushed bacon on the top. Barbecue sauce is poured onto this mass, followed by a sprinkle of barbecue seasoning. The result contains at least 5,000 calories (21 kJ).
Bacon ice cream		England	Bacon ice cream (or bacon-and-egg ice cream) is a modern invention in experimental cookery, generally created by adding bacon to egg custard and freezing the mixture. Although it was a joke in a Two Ronnies sketch, it was eventually created for April Fools' Day. Heston Blumenthal experimented with the creation of ice cream, making a custard similar to scrambled eggs then adding bacon to create one of his signature dishes. It now appears on dessert menus in other high-end restaurants.
Bacon sundae		United States	The bacon sundae has been a seasonal offering sold by American restaurant chains Burger King and Denny's.
Bacon martini		United States	A bacon martini is made by soaking strips of browned bacon in vodka for at least a day. It is finished when the vodka becomes opaque. A bacon martini is served by pouring it into a mixing glass half full of ice cubes and mixing in a little vermouth.
Bacon sandwich		United Kingdom	A bacon sandwich is a form of sandwich made from cooked bacon between two slices of bread, usually buttered. Often some form of sauce, such as Brown sauce or Ketchup, is included.
Bacon vodka			A bacon flavoured vodka that is often used in cocktails such as Bloody Mary or bacon martini.
Bacon-wrapped scallops			Scallops wrapped with bacon and then cooked.
Bacon-wrapped shrimp			Bacon-wrapped shrimp are shrimps which have the tails removed and are wrapped in bacon.
Baconator		United States	A hamburger from Wendy's that consist of two beef patties, two slices of American cheese, six strips of bacon, mayonnaise, and ketchup on a bun.
Bacone		San Francisco	A cone made of bacon filled with scrambled eggs, hash browns, cheese and topped with country gravy and a biscuit.
BLT sandwich		Great Britain	A bacon, lettuce, and tomato sandwich (BLT) is a closed-face sandwich containing mayonnaise and layers of bacon, lettuce leaves, and tomato slices. Culinary evidence shows that bacon, lettuce, and tomato sandwiches are descended from the Victorian age tea sandwiches.
Chicken fried bacon		Texas	A dish from Texas, served with a white gravy or cream sauce.
Chivito (sandwich)		Uruguay	A national dish of Uruguay that consists primarily of a thin slice of filet mignon (churrasco beef), with mayonnaise, black or green olives, mozzarella, tomatoes and commonly also bacon, fried or hardboiled eggs and ham. It is served in a bun, often with a side of French fries.
Chocolate covered bacon		United States	Sometimes offered at state fairs and in gourmet candy bars.
Clams casino		Rhode Island	Clam "on the halfshell" with bacon, a dish believed to have originated in Narragansett, Rhode Island.
Club sandwich		United States	A traditional American sandwich with bacon and others meats like turkey or chicken, as well as vegetable toppings such as lettuce and tomatoes. Mayonnaise is spread on the bread, which is toasted.
Cobb salad		United States	A garden salad that includes bacon, avocado, hard-boiled egg, and roquefort cheese.
Coddle		Ireland	An Irish dish consisting of layers of roughly sliced pork sausages and thinly sliced, somewhat fatty back bacon with sliced potatoes, and onions.
Čvarci		Balkans	A speciality of West Balkan cuisine that consists of thick bacon pieces that are fried in their own fat.
Fool's Gold Loaf		Denver, Colorado	An Elvis favorite: the sandwich consists of a single warmed, hollowed-out loaf of bread filled with one jar of creamy peanut butter, one jar of grape jelly, and a pound of bacon.
Garbure		France	A thick French soup or stew of ham with cabbage and other vegetables, usually with cheese and stale bread added.
Guanciale		Italy	An unsmoked Italian bacon prepared with pig's jowl or cheeks.
Hangtown fry		California	A type of omelette made famous during the California Gold Rush in the 1850s. The most common version includes bacon and oysters combined with eggs, and fried together.
Hoppin' John		Southern United States	Southern United States version of Rice and beans that also contains bacon and chopped onions beside the traditional ingredients beans and rice.
Hot Brown		Louisville, Kentucky	The Hot Brown is an open-faced sandwich of turkey and bacon, covered in Mornay or cheese sauce. May include other spices and tomatoes.
Jambonette		France	A French culinary term for chopped pork and bacon enclosed in rind, moulded into a pear shape and cooked.
Kranjska klobasa		Slovenia	A Slovenian sausage that consists of pork, beef, bacon and spices.
Kugelis		Lithuania	A Lithuanian national dish that can be described as a casserole made with potatoes, onion, milk, bacon and eggs and eaten with apple sauce.
Luther Burger		United States	A sandwich or burger that is made with a doughnut instead of a burger bun and contains a beef patty, bacon strips and sometimes sliced cheese and is served with French fries.
Maple bacon donut		United States	A maple bacon doughnut is built by placing strips of bacon on a soft maple doughnut with maple icing. In the pictured type, two strips of bacon lie along the donut. Another version uses crushed bacon bits on an O-shaped donut.
Mitch Morgan		Telluride, Colorado	A cocktail that consists of a shot of bourbon whiskey served with a piece of fried bacon as a cocktail garnish.
Oysters en brochette		New Orleans	A traditional dish of the Creole cuisine of New Orleans. It is skewers of raw oysters alternating with pieces of partially cooked bacon that are breaded with corn flour and then deep-fried or sautéed. The pieces are then usually removed from the skewers and served on top of triangle toasts with Meunière sauce.
Peanut butter, banana and bacon sandwich		United States	A peanut butter, banana, and bacon sandwich is a closed-face sandwich containing peanut butter, chopped bacon, and sliced bananas.
Pig candy		United States	Pig candy is a dessert made from thick strips of smoked bacon and pecans coated them in caramel or another type of sugar.
Pigs in blankets		United Kingdom	In the United Kingdom, "pigs in blankets" refers to small sausages (usually chipolatas) wrapped in bacon.
Pīrags		Latvia	An oblong or crescent-shaped baked Latvian bread roll or pastry, most often containing a filling of finely chopped bacon and onion
Quiche Lorraine		France	Quiche /ˈkiːʃ/ Lorraine is a baked dish made with eggs and milk or cream in a pastry crust in the form of an open-topped pie. It contains cheese smoked bacon or lardons.
Rouladen		Germany	A traditional dish in German cuisine bacon, onion, pickles and mustard that are wrapped in thinly sliced beef and then broiled. Otherwise known as Beef Olives.
Rumaki		Polynesian	Duck or chicken liver wrapped in bacon.
Samgyeopsal		Korea	A Korean dish of grilled at your table bacon served with a pepper sauce.
Salt pork			Salt-cured pork that was a common standard portion throughout the American Civil War.
Seven-layer salad		United States	A salad that consist of (at least) seven layers of which one is made of bacon pieces. Other layers may include iceberg lettuce, tomatoes, cucumbers, onions, sweet peas, hard boiled eggs and sharp cheddar cheese. The salad is garnished with a mayonnaise-based dressing and/or sour cream.
Szalonna		Hungary	Hungarian back bacon made of smoked pork fat with the rind and traditional in Hungarian cuisine.
Slavink		Netherlands	A Dutch meat dish consisting usually of ground meat called "half and half" (half beef, half pork) wrapped in bacon and cooked in butter or vegetable.
Stegt Flæsk		Denmark	A dish from Denmark of thick slices of bacon often eaten with potatoes and parsley sauce "med persillesovs."
Tatws Pum Munud		Wales	Traditional Welsh Stew made with sliced vegetables and potatoes and smoked bacon.
Túrós csusza		Hungary	A Hungarian savoury curd cheese or cottage cheese noodle dish made with small home made noodles or pasta and topped with crispy fried bacon and sour cream.

== See also ==
- Bacon mania
- List of bacon substitutes
- List of ham dishes
- List of pork dishes
- List of sausage dishes
- List of smoked foods
