= BLT cocktail =

Vodka cocktail with bacon, lettuce and tomato

BLT
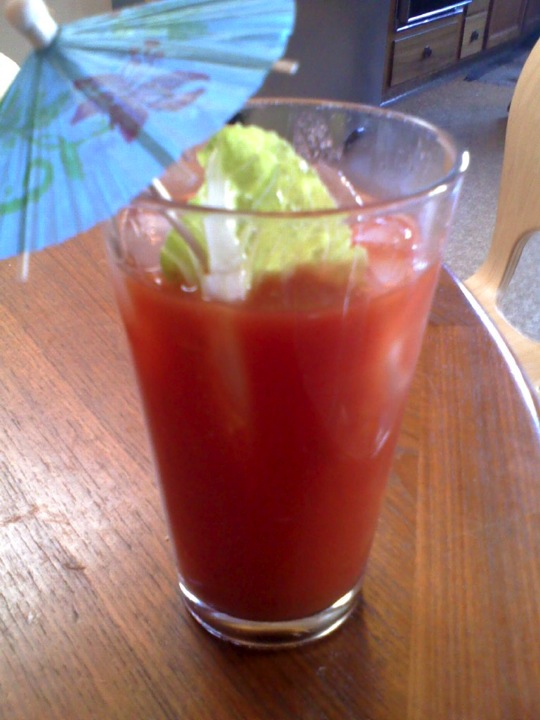
- BLT cocktail with Bloody Mary
- Type: Mixed drink
- Ingredients: Bacon; Lettuce or Liquor; Tomato; Vodka or Bacon vodka
- Standard garnish: Bacon salt
- Served: Straight up: chilled, without ice

A BLT cocktail is a cocktail made out of the contents of a BLT sandwich (bacon, lettuce and tomato), blended together with vodka. Variants on the drink include utilizing bacon vodka instead of traditional vodka, substituting liquor for lettuce, incorporating bacon salt, or including cucumber flavored vodka.

The drink gained popularity in the United States in 2009. Varieties of the beverage were served in regions including Colorado, Florida, Maine, Massachusetts, Missouri, Oregon, and Virginia. It has also achieved notice in Canada and the United Kingdom.

Frank Bruni, the chief restaurant critic for The New York Times, gave a favorable review in 2007 to a BLT cocktail made by chef Gordon Ramsay. An Associated Press review in 2009 of the BLT cocktail made by mixologist Todd Thrasher of Alexandria, Virginia described it as "a drink full of mind-bending, taste bud-tingling turns". Food critics have given the beverage favorable reviews in The Boston Globe, The Times of London, and the Toronto, Ontario, Canada-based newspaper The Globe and Mail.

== History ==
In 2007, Frank Bruni, the chief restaurant critic for The New York Times, favorably reviewed a BLT cocktail made by chef Gordon Ramsay. The Oregonian reported in July 2009 that in an establishment in Oregon called the Gilt Club, mixologists coated the rim of the glass the BLT cocktail is served in with salt combined with crushed bacon. A variety of the BLT cocktail was invented in Aspen, Colorado and gained notice in August 2009. A different version was invented in Alexandria, Virginia and was popularized through coverage in August 2009 in the Associated Press. A 2010 report by the Omaha World-Herald noted that a version of the drink made in Omaha, Nebraska substituted liquor in the acronym "BLT" instead of lettuce.

The Bulletin noted that a 2011 edition of the drink produced in Oregon was made with bacon vodka manufactured on site at the restaurant The Blacksmith. A report by The Sarasota Herald-Tribune in April 2012 observed that a variety on the cocktail made by mixologist Paul Yeomans in Florida was concocted utilizing bacon salt and tomato water, infused with cucumber vodka. This version was a favorite selection among customers at The Table Creekside in Sarasota, Florida. The Food Network recommended additional ingredients including lemon juice, bourbon, Worcestershire sauce, and horseradish.

== Analysis ==
In an August 2009 article for The Globe and Mail, Sarah Boesveld noted it was too difficult for individuals to make bacon vodka at home, and instead recommended they utilize bacon salt to make their own BLT cocktails or Blood Mary drinks with bacon. In a 2009 restaurant review by the Associated Press, they described the BLT cocktail made by mixologist Todd Thrasher of Alexandria, Virginia as, "a drink full of mind-bending, taste bud-tingling turns. A huge ice cube, made with lettuce water, anchors a glass rimmed with bacon salt. Clear tomato water and bacon-infused vodka are mixed and poured over the lettuce cube." Metromix called this edition of the beverage, "a zesty mix of bacon-infused vodka, tomato water and iceberg lettuce ice". Woman's Day magazine featured the concoction by Todd Thrasher in its article on "the most outrageous drinks" in the United States.

The drink was served in 2010 as part "Gastro art event" recommended by The Times. The newspaper compared the beverage to "the minimalism of Rothko". The Willamette Week reviewed the Gilt Club in Portland, Oregon in 2011, and chose the BLT cocktail as part of its "Ideal Meal" feature. Bintliff's in Ogunquit, Maine served the beverage in 2012 to Amy K. Anderson of Maine Magazine, who commented, "The BLT cocktail has a wood smoke flavor that makes for very easy sipping." In October 2012, Nilina Mason-Campbell of Société Perrier characterized the BLT cocktail served at the establishment Wildwood in northwest Portland, Oregon as one of the highlights of its menu.

== See also ==
- Bacon martini
- Bacon soda
- Bacon vodka
- List of cocktails
- Mitch Morgan
- 2010s in food
