= Bacon martini =

Cocktail of bacon-infused vodka

Bacon Martini
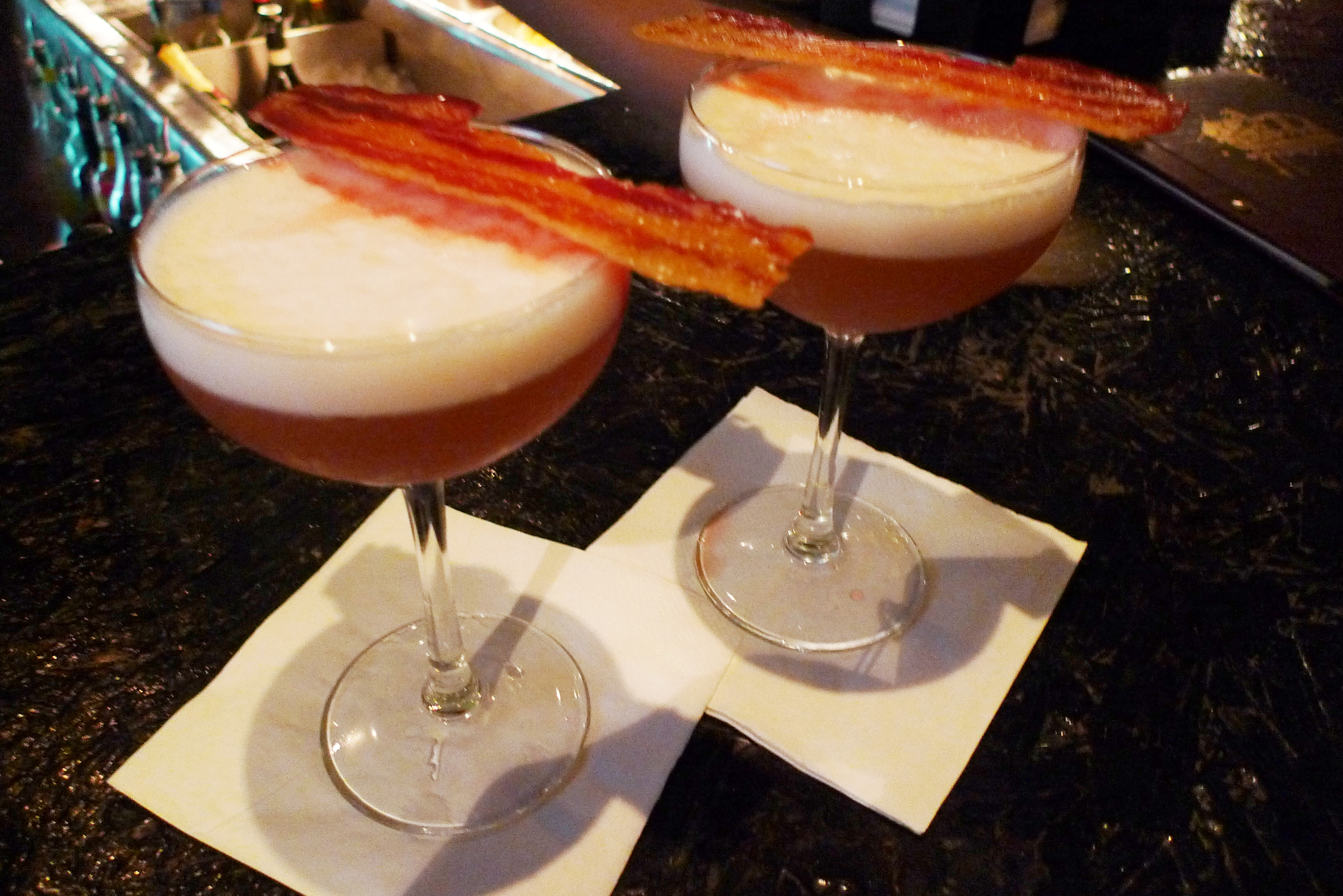
- Bacon and egg Martinis
- Type: Cocktail
- Ingredients: 50ml bacon vodka; strip of bacon, olive (garnish)
- Standard drinkware: Cosmopolitan or cocktail glass
- Standard garnish: bacon, olive
- Served: Straight up: chilled, without ice

A Bacon Martini, also known as bacontini, pig on the rocks or a bloody bacon martini, is a cocktail that consists of bacon-infused vodka served with a garnish that can include strips of bacon, bacon bits, or olives. Variants may include the addition of Bloody Mary mix. Although not a vodka martini, which consists of vodka and vermouth, the term "bacon martini" is consistent with the trend of calling any straight liquor in a martini glass a "martini," such as the saketini or other variations.

== Origin ==
The bacon martini was invented independently by Sang Yoon, owner of the gastropub Father's Office in Santa Monica, California, and P. Moss, owner of the Double Down Saloon in Las Vegas, Nevada. Sang Yoon made his bacon martini in 1998, inspired by the Bacon of the Month Club run by the Grateful Palate in Fairfield, California. P. Moss appears to have concocted his bacon martini the same year. Sang Yoon's version of the drink uses juniper-cured bacon, while P. Moss's method calls for hickory-smoked bacon.

== Preparation ==
To make a bacon martini, the vodka needs to be prepared in advance through a process called fat washing. This is done by soaking strips of cooked bacon in vodka and straining off the fat, similar to the process for marinating meat before cooking. The drink is ready when the liquid becomes filmy and opaque. At the Double Down Saloon in the East Village in New York City, the bacon martini is created by straining the bacon-infused vodka through shaken ice and serving it in a martini glass with a piece of bacon at the bottom, similar to the worm in a bottle of mezcal.

== Taste ==
The taste of bacon martinis is similar to that of vodka martinis, but with a spicier and saltier bacon flavor and a tangy "heat". According to a saloon owner, the pork fat reacts with vodka to give the drink its unique taste. Reviews of the beverage have been varied, with one drinker comparing it to Castrol motor oil, and a bacon enthusiast saying it was a satisfying and delicious beverage on many levels. A club in San Francisco was selling bacon martinis with bourbon instead of vodka (which is actually a Mitch Morgan), arguing that vodka absorbs too much of the charcoal smokiness flavor.

== See also ==
- Bacon Salt
- Bacon soda
- Bacon vodka
- BLT cocktail
- Mitch Morgan
