= List of bacon substitutes =

This is a list of bacon substitutes. A number of substitutes exist for people who, for ethical, environmental, health, religious, or other reasons, prefer not to eat bacon. The flavor of smoked paprika resembles cooked bacon to some people.

== Bacon substitutes ==
Name	Image	Origin	Description
Baconnaise		United States	A kosher mayonnaise-based product developed by J&D's Foods that is prepared to taste like bacon, Baconnaise is vegetarian and contains no bacon. Its creators have also stated that Baconnaise has no artificial flavors or monosodium glutamate, but that the actual process and ingredients in the product are a trade secret.
Eggplant Bacon		United States	Recipes have been floating around for Eggplant Bacon for a while. Pingala Cafe in Burlington, Vermont, has begun producing a commercial version.
Bacon Salt		United States	Another product developed by J&D's Foods, it is vegetarian and kosher.
Macon		United Kingdom	Prepared from mutton, it is prepared in a similar manner to bacon, with the meat being cured by soaking it in large quantities of salt or by soaking the meat in brine. It was produced in the United Kingdom during World War II when rationing was instituted. Scottish lawyer and politician Frederick Alexander Macquisten was the first to suggest mass-production of macon.
Sizzlean		United States	A cured meat product manufactured throughout the 1970s and 1980s, it was originally produced by Swift & Co. Though the product contained much less fat than bacon, it was still 37% fat by weight.
Turkey bacon			An imitation bacon, it is usually prepared from smoked, chopped, and formed turkey and commonly marketed as a low-fat alternative to bacon. Turkey bacon can be used as a substitute for bacon where religious restrictions forbid the consumption of pork.
Vegetarian bacon			Also known as "fakon", it is marketed as a bacon alternative and available in supermarkets. It is generally high in protein and fiber, yet low in fat, and typically has no cholesterol. Pictured is vegetarian bacon along with other breakfast foods.

== See also ==
- List of bacon dishes
- List of meat substitutes
- Meat analogue
- Vegetarian bacon
