= 2010s in food in the United States =

The 2010s in food in the United States describes food trends that are characteristic of the 2010s decade. Many of the trends are a direct result of related social or economic events.

== Trends ==
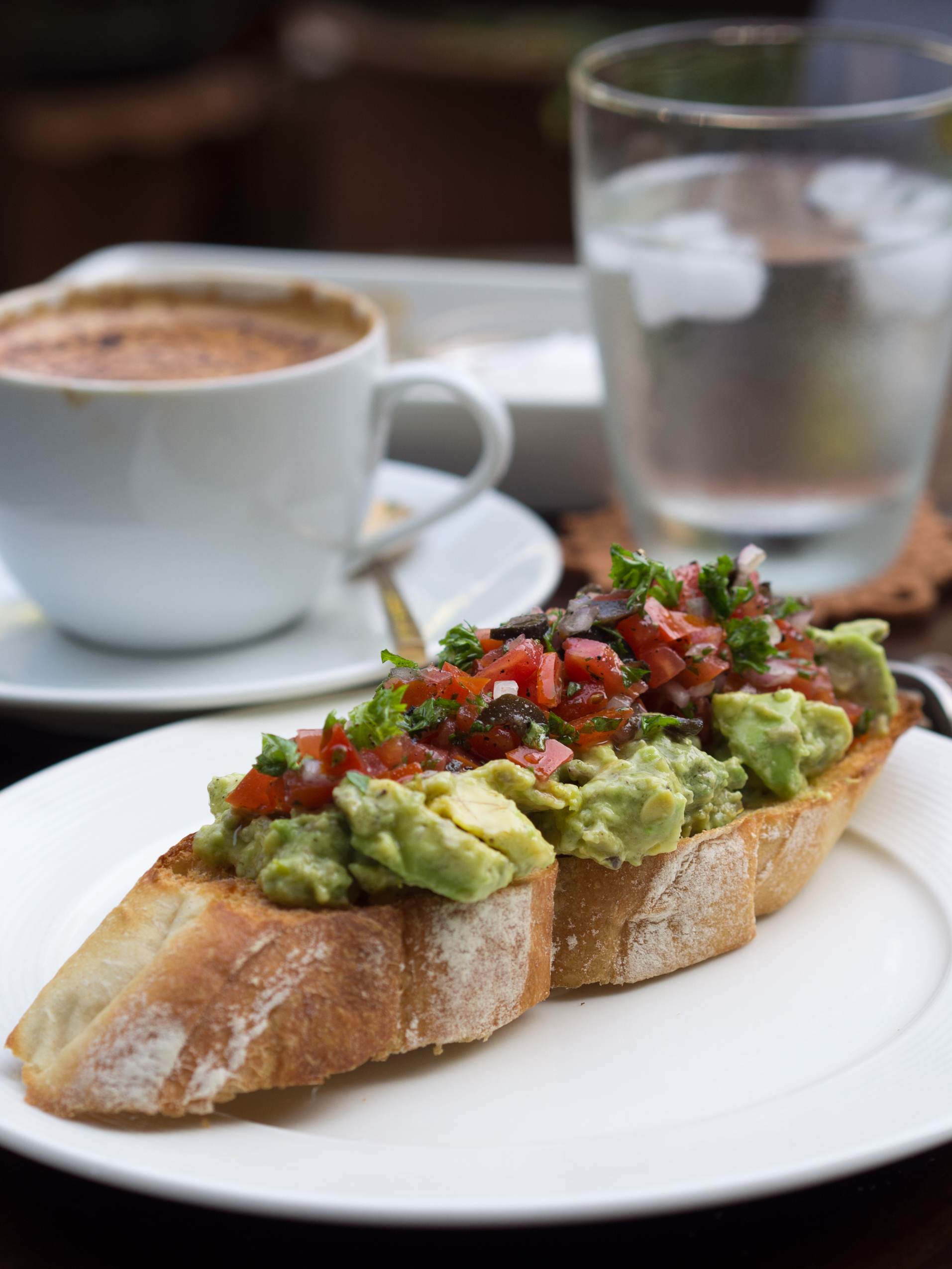
Avocado salad and tomato and black olive salsa on a toasted baguette

Gluten-free diets became popular. Fusion cuisine offered a new twist on many traditional food items. An interest in local and organic foods carried over from the mid to late 2000s as a part of green and sustainable living. There was an increase in the number of vegetarians and vegans. The Economist declared 2019 "the year of the vegan." Spicy foods were popular, sometimes in new ways. Finger foods such as hors d'oeuvres and tapas were applied to many desserts and comfort foods. Chipotle's success caused its fast casual made-to-order business model to carry over to many other food categories. Food presentation became more important as social media caused an increase in food photography and sharing. In the United States, soda sales dipped in favor of healthier options, such as sparkling water. Energy drink sales experienced substantially higher growth than coffee. Caffeinated products spilled over to things like gum and mints. The 2010s also saw significant early stage developments in cultured meat, a form of cellular agriculture whereby animal cells are cultured in order to grow meat without the need to raise and slaughter animals. This technology also saw substantial investment from billionaire entrepreneurs such as Richard Branson. Waste and resource-conscious chefs also saw a spread of zero waste cooking.

List of popular foods

- Avocado products
  - Guacamole
  - Avocado toast
- Bacon-infused dishes
  - Bacon ice cream
  - Chocolate-covered bacon
  - Maple bacon donuts
  - Baconnaise
  - Bacon salt
- Coconut oil
- Edible cookie dough
- Fried pickles
- Macaron
- Middle Eastern cuisine
  - Hummus
  - Tahini sauce
- Korean barbecue
- Meat substitutes
  - Cauliflower
  - Eggplant
- Pretzel buns
- Ramen
- Salted caramel flavored products
- Spices
  - Turmeric
- Sriracha Sauce
- Stir-fried ice cream
- Gourmet tacos
- Gourmet/craft hamburgers
  - Craft burgers
- Tostones
- Unicorn food
- Vegetable chips
- Quinoa

List of popular drinks

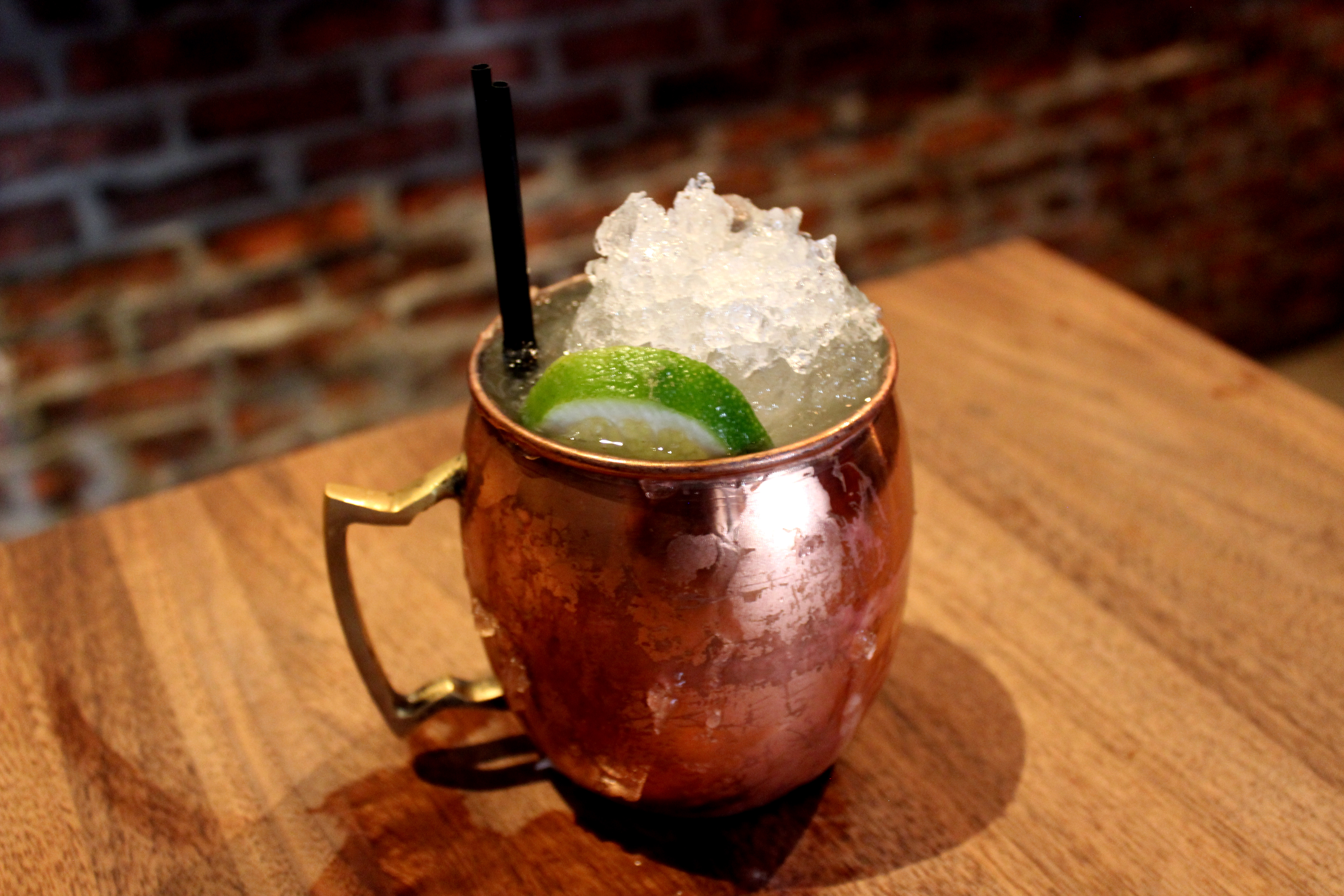
A Moscow mule

- Kombucha
- Aloe vera juice
- Bacon-infused drinks
  - Bacon vodka
  - BLT cocktail
- Hard cider
- Cocktails
  - Beer cocktails
  - Bitters cocktails
- Premium coffee
  - Coffee ice cubes
  - Latte art
  - Third wave of coffee
- Craft beer and Microbrewery
  - Draught IPA
- Cold brew coffee and tea
- Gin
- Matcha tea
- Milkshakes with extravagant toppings
- Milk substitutes such as Plant milk
  - Coconut milk
  - Almond milk
  - Oat milk
  - Soy milk
- Mocktails (Low-ABV cocktails)
- Moscow mules
- Savory drinks
  - Salted beer and cocktails
  - Spicy drinks and cocktails
- Shooters
- Single-serve drinks
  - Bottled cocktails
  - Canned coffee
  - Single-serve wine
- Soda alternatives
  - Coconut water
  - Sparkling water
- Tea-infused beer and mixed drinks
- Hard seltzer

== Foodservice ==
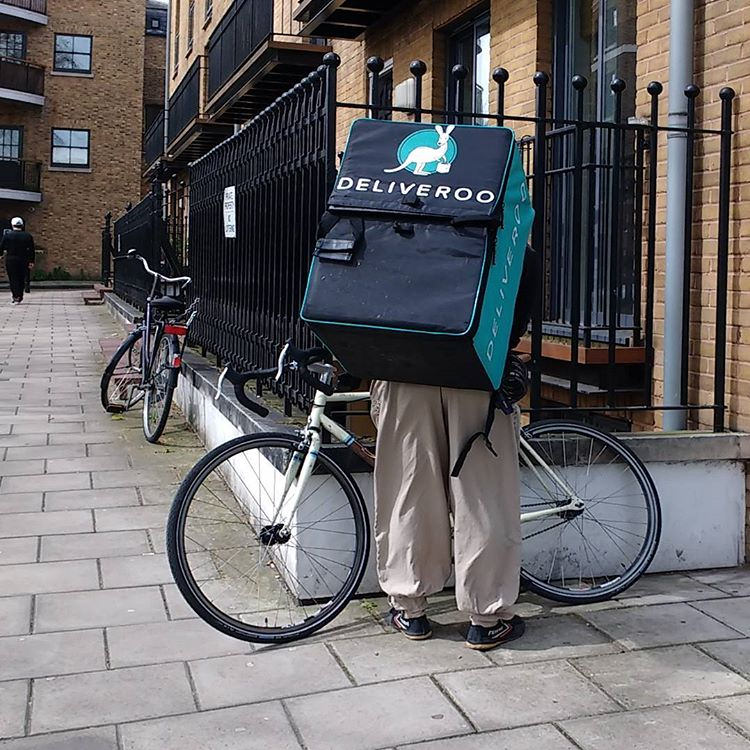
Deliveroo cyclist in London, UK.

Online food ordering and food trucks increase in popularity. Chipotle's success caused its fast casual made-to-order business model to carry over to many other food categories.

== Events ==
=== Releases ===
Date	Event
2016	PepsiCo launches the Pepsi Spire, a competitor to the Coca-Cola Freestyle that had been launched in 2009.

=== Incorporations ===
Date	Event
July 2, 2015	The Kraft Heinz Company is formed by the merger of Kraft Foods Group and Heinz in 2015.
