= Gluten-free beer =

Beer made from ingredients that do not contain gluten

Gluten-free beer is beer made from ingredients that do not contain gluten, such as millet, rice, sorghum, buckwheat or corn (maize). People who have gluten intolerance (including celiac disease and dermatitis herpetiformis sufferers) have a reaction to certain proteins in the grains commonly used to make beer, barley and wheat. The hordein found in barley and the gliadin found in wheat are types of gluten that can trigger symptoms in sufferers of these diseases. Gluten-free beer is part of a gluten-free diet.

== Gluten-free beer, low-gluten beer, and standard beer ==
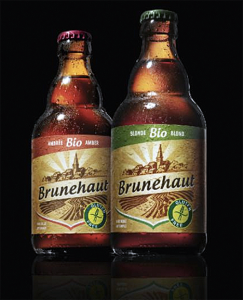
Amber (left) and Blonde (right), Brunehaut organic, gluten-free Belgian beer

Beers brewed mainly from cereals such as millet, rice, sorghum, buckwheat and corn (maize), which do not contain gluten, do not trigger an autoimmune response in celiacs. Some brewers brew with barley or rye, and reduce the level of gluten to below 20 ppm. This may be achieved by using enzymes such as Clarex, which break down gluten proteins in beer brewed with barley, as well as helping to filter the brew. In most countries this technically classifies them as gluten-free beers, but in the United States, they are classified as gluten-reduced beers. These brewers believe they are safe to drink. The brewers argue that the proteins from barley are converted into non-harmful amino acids. Statements from brewers show that their scientists feel confident that their product is non-harmful to those who are gluten intolerant. Some celiacs report problems drinking these beers. However, there is some concern and evidence that the claim is not true.(for example: Sheehan, Evans & Skerritt, 2001).

Brewers who produce low gluten beers are required to test every batch for gluten, and record gluten levels in "parts per million" ('ppm'). Although the barley hordein in such tests may not be detected, smaller pieces of these proteins, known as peptides, may remain and be toxic for celiacs. Those involved in gluten-free brewing, and others representing celiacs or those with other conditions that require a gluten-free diet, tend to be concerned that beer brewed using wheat or barley are not appropriate for those with celiacs or dermatitis herpetiformis, although the carefully controlled gluten levels of particular malt brews of England and Finland may be low enough to be consumed in relative safety (Against the Grain, 5 ppm; Sinebrychoff Koff III, 20 ppm; Laitilan Kukko Pils, 4 ppm).

In August 2013 the FDA approved labeling standards that allow foods and beverages with 20 ppm or less of gluten to be labeled "gluten-free". Some beers that are not traditionally sold as gluten free have been shown to meet this criterion, and those who are gluten intolerant may be able to drink them without ill effect. This depends on individual sensitivity, as each person displays a different level at which an autoimmune response will be activated. As such, there is ongoing debate about acceptable gluten "levels" to celiacs.

According to tests done by the Argentine Coeliac Association (ACELA) and the Swedish National Food Agency, several brands of beer including Carlsberg, Corona and Pilsner Urquell contain less than 20 ppm, allowing them to be described as gluten-free. According to the FDA, beers made from gluten containing grains can not be considered "gluten free". The Corona website mentions "There are traces of gluten in all our beers. We recommend that you consult your physician regarding consumption."

The recent development of gluten-free ales and lagers has been seen as a positive move forward for those who suffer a variety of related gluten intolerant conditions; and there are a number of brands working to produce gluten-free beer. Of gluten-free products, beer is seen as the most difficult to produce in a commercially acceptable version. As of early 2012, a fast-growing range of ales and lagers is becoming widely available. There are now over 30 breweries producing gluten free beer in the United States, and as of 2019, there are 12 breweries that are 100% dedicated gluten free. The first gluten free beer to be granted label approval by the US Government is New Grist, brewed by Lakefront Brewery in Milwaukee, WI.

== Home brewing ==
Formulas for home brewing gluten-free beer can now be found. Many of these include a sweet sorghum syrup as the principal carbohydrate. This is commercially manufactured from sorghum grain to be a malt substitute and contains amino acids and unfermentable sugars needed for yeast nutrition and "mouth feel". Other sugars can be added for character and "feel", such as honey and maltodextrin, and roasted or malted buckwheat.

Gluten Free home brewing is now easy with commercially available gluten free home brewing kits containing the sorghum syrup, hops, yeast and other items. The cost of the kits, while more expensive than standard home brew kits, still produce very drinkable GF beer for less than the cost of a standard commercial beer. Many find the taste of GF beers to be missing something. Adding additional hops has been found to improve flavour greatly.

== Gluten-free beer festivals ==
The first international gluten-free beer festival was held in February 2006 in Chesterfield, United Kingdom, as a joint enterprise between the Campaign for Real Ale (CAMRA).

== See also ==
- Beer
- Buckwheat
- Coeliacs
- Gliadin
- Gluten-free diet
- Hordein
- Sorghum
- Dermatitis herpetiformis
- 2010s in food
