= Bacon cake =

Dish made with bacon

Bacon cake is a cake made with bacon, either savory or sweet, and generally baked in an oven, although it's sometimes cooked in a skillet on a range top.

== Savory bacon cake ==
A savory bacon cake is like a potato cake, and can be made with potatoes or other root vegetables such as parsnips. An 1830 cookbook offers a simple recipe consisting of cooked bacon, flour, salt, and water.

Estonian pekikook is a bacon cake not unlike a quiche, made with eggs and a small amount of flour.

== Sweet bacon cake ==
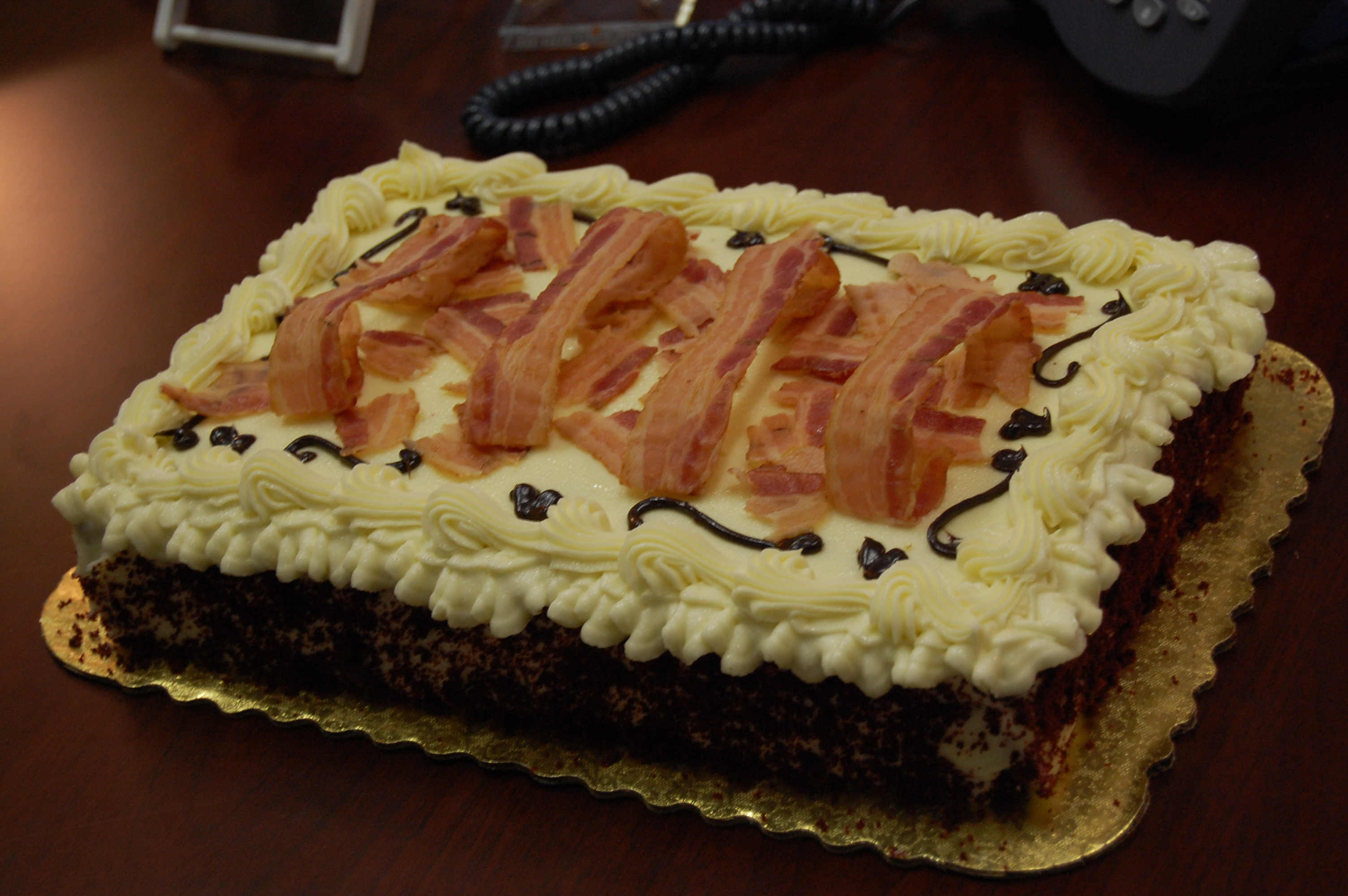
Cake with a topping of bacon.

A sweet bacon cake typically has bacon as a flavor accent or topping. Bacon pairs well with chocolate, and recipes for chocolate bacon cake are numerous. A related item is the bacon cupcake.

Bacon cake as a guilty pleasure is found among various American authors including Dan Savage and Garrison Keillor.

== See also ==
- List of bacon dishes
- Pizza cake
- Dutch-Indonesian spekkoek – the name translates as bacon cake, but it contains no bacon. The name refers to its striped appearance.
