= The War Amps =

Canadian nonprofit organization

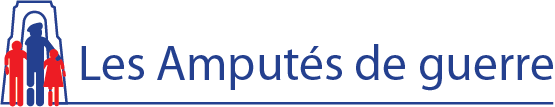
- Founded: 1918
- Founder: Amputee War Veterans
- Type: Nonprofit organization
- Registration no.: 131969628 RR0001
- Purpose: Support programs for amputees
- Location: Ottawa, Ontario, Canada
- Region served: Canada
- Website: waramps.ca

The War Amps is a Canadian registered nonprofit organization, established in 1918 with the purpose of assisting veteran amputees. Initially founded to serve war veterans with financial and advisory supports, the non-profit has since expanded their services to assist to all amputees in Canada.

The association provides multiple programs that specifically target the needs of child, adult, and veteran amputees. The charity generates funding through the offering of their Key Tag and Address Label services, in which donations are made optional.

== History ==
The organization began as The Amputation Club of British Columbia. However, it later became The War Amputations of Canada, eventually shortening to the War Amps.

In 1978, the War Amps began its long-running children's safety campaign "PlaySafe". A 1984 public service announcement for the campaign, designed by Peter Svatech introduced Astar, a robot character created by then CEO Cliff Chadderton, who was used to demonstrate dangers that could lead to amputations. The PSA received a positive reception due to its response from youth audiences, while frequent airplay during Saturday-morning cartoon blocks helped the spot become part of Canadian popular culture. Astar would serve as the War Amps' mascot for several decades, and a new computer animated remake of the PSA was introduced in 2000. Astar was later retired in favour of featuring youth amputees as "safety ambassadors" in future campaigns.

== Services ==
- Key Tags: Beginning in 1946 war amputees were given work by producing key tags. In 1972, this program began to serve year-round employment for disabled staff. If a bunch of keys is found with a War Amps tag, dropping the keys in a Canadian mailbox will allow the keys to be returned to their registered owner. War Amps reports that the key service has returned more than 1.5 million lost keys.
- Operation Legacy: A program designed to preserve and commemorate Canada’s military heritage by teaching youth about Canadian wartime history.
- Documentaries: War Amps has produced a number of documentaries about Canada's military heritage.

== Notable contributors ==
- Adrian Anantawan, active member and spokesperson
- Mary Riter Hamilton painted for 'The Gold Stripe', a collection of work chronicling the Great War with all proceeds going to War Amps.
- Mark Arendz, Canadian Paralympian
- Talli Osborne, Canadian musician and public speaker
