= Shelter Music Boston =

Nonprofit music organization in Massachusetts

Shelter Music Boston is a nonprofit organization that presents classical music concerts at homeless shelters in the Boston area. It was founded in 2010 by violinist Julie Leven.

== History ==
In December 2009, Leven read about violinist Kelly Hall-Tompkins, who was giving concerts in homeless shelters in New York City. Leven recruited musicians and contacted a staff member at the Shattuck Shelter in Jamaica Plain.

By 2014, the group was performing at seven sites, including Pine Street Inn shelters, the Dimock Center and Community Day Center Waltham. In 2015, it was presenting about 70 concerts a year.

== Programs ==
The group's chamber music performances include discussions with audience members. Its shelter concerts are free, and the musicians are paid. It also performs at substance use recovery centers and affordable-housing communities.

In September 2019, Shelter Music Boston gave the premiere of Florence Comes Home, a chamber opera by Francine Trester about the composer Florence Price, at Pine Street Women's Inn. The approximately 20-minute opera was performed alongside Price's Four Folksongs in Counterpoint.

During the COVID-19 pandemic, the organization began working with Homeowners Rehab, an affordable-housing provider in Cambridge. Musicians performed in courtyards, where residents could listen from their windows.

For the 2023 program "Songs of Life", artistic director Adrian Anantawan invited four composers to write works for string quartet based on songs suggested by shelter audiences. The program included Trester's Tiger Eye, which drew on Survivor's song "Eye of the Tiger".
