= Jambonette =

Form of charcuterie

Jambonnette
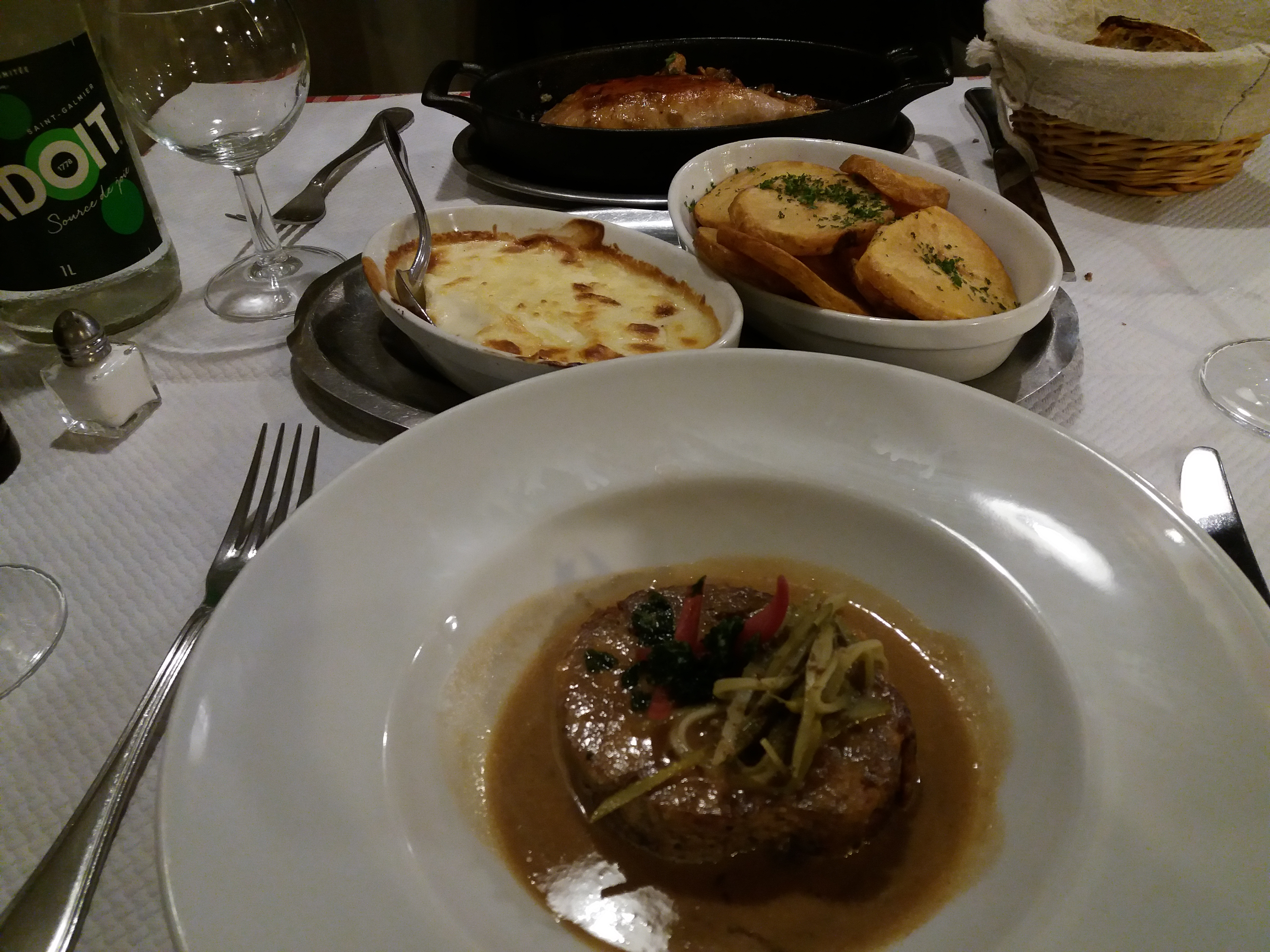
- Pork and chicken ham (jambonnette)
- Type: Charcuterie
- Place of origin: France
- Main ingredients: Pork and bacon

A jambonnette is a form of charcuterie composed of approximately equal parts of chopped pork and bacon enclosed in rind, moulded into a pear shape and cooked. It may also refer to stuffed ham or poultry leg.

== See also ==
- Galantine
- Jambonneau
