= Tatws Pum Munud =

Welsh stew with smoked bacon, stock, potatoes and other vegetables

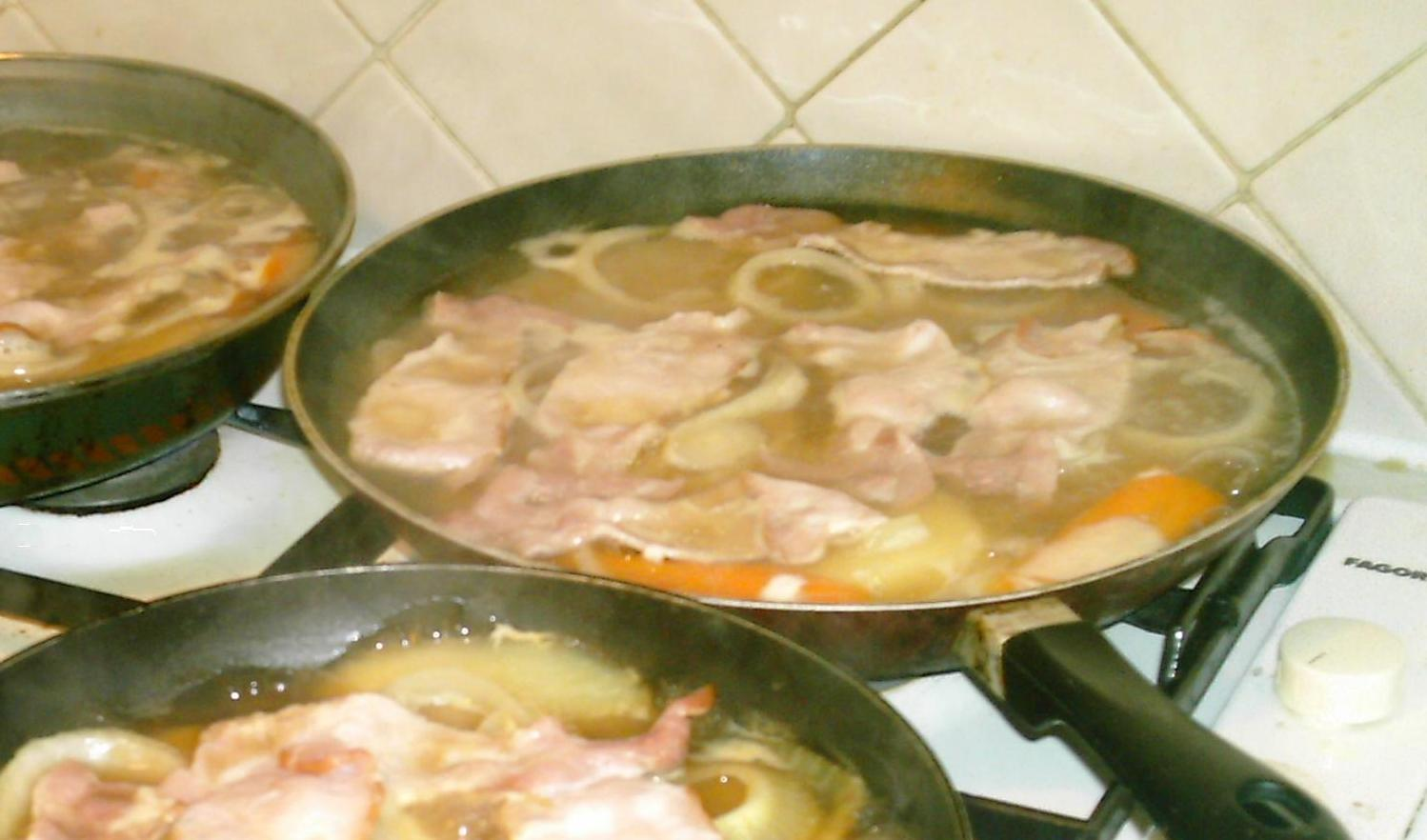
- Tatws Pum Munud being cooked
- Course: Main
- Place of origin: Wales
- Serving temperature: Hot
- Main ingredients: Bacon and vegetables

Tatws Pum Munud [ˈtatʊs pɨ̞m ˈmɨːnɨ̞d] (English: Five-minute potatoes) is a traditional Welsh stew, made with smoked bacon, stock, potatoes and other vegetables.

== Recipe ==
The vegetables used are typically potatoes, onions, and carrots sliced lengthwise. Although more usually made with smoked bacon, minced beef may be used as a substitute. As a stew, it is unique in that all the main ingredients are cut into slices, and layered into a large frying pan so they lie flat. The ingredients are then simmered slowly until the potatoes become tender, and then seasoned with salt and pepper.

The dish is commonly served on a plate (as opposed to a bowl) with crusty bread. Perhaps oddly, for a Welsh dish, it is also normally served with Worcestershire sauce on the side.

== Tatws Popty ==
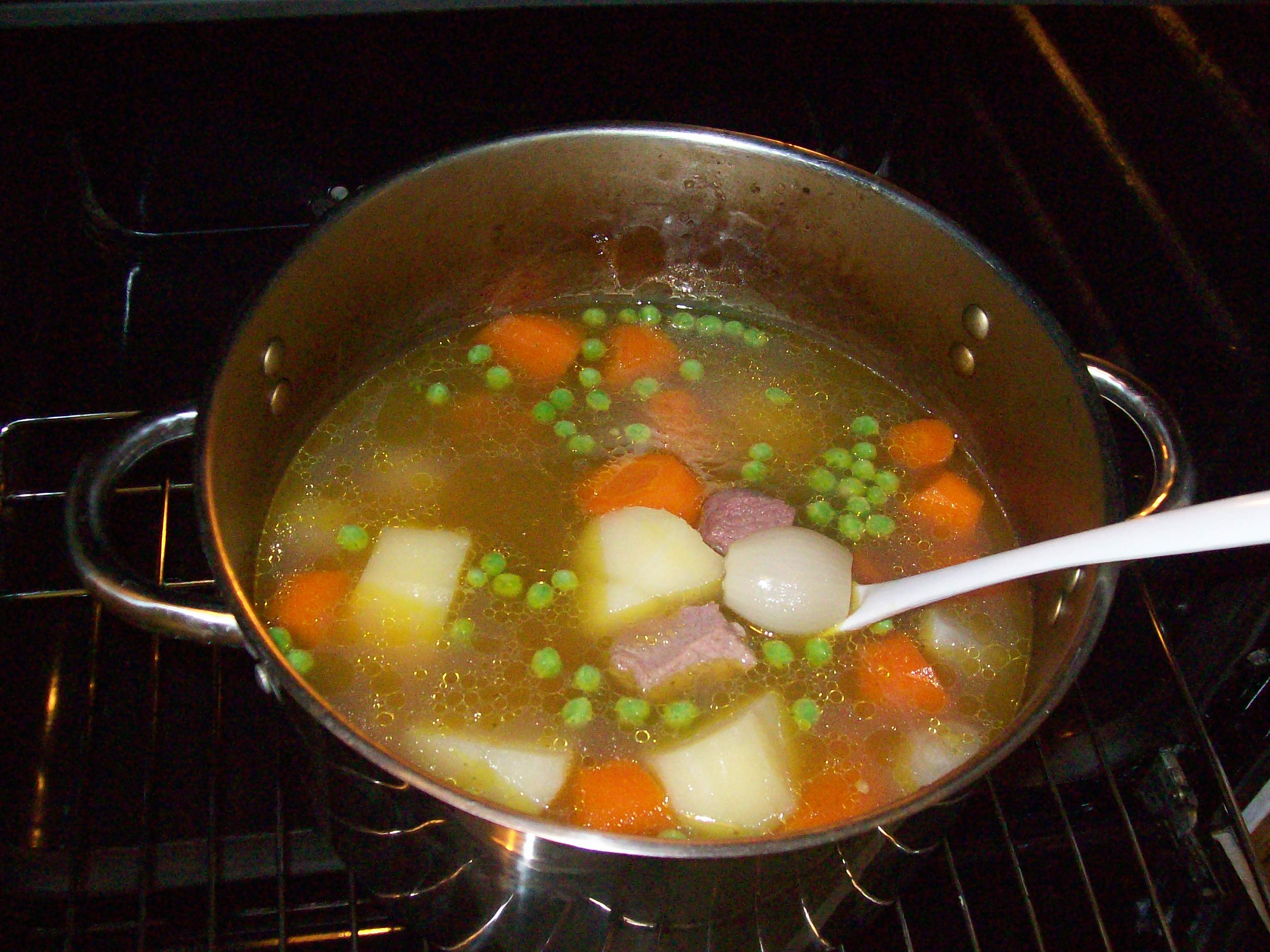
Another traditional Welsh dish, Tatws Popty is similar to Tatws Pum Munud, but is cooked in an oven.

A similar dish, called Tatws Popty (English: Oven potatoes) or Tatws Pobdu, is made using chunky vegetables, and cooked in an oven.

== See also ==
- List of bacon dishes
- List of stews
