= Double Down Saloon =

Dive bar and live music venue in Las Vegas, Nevada

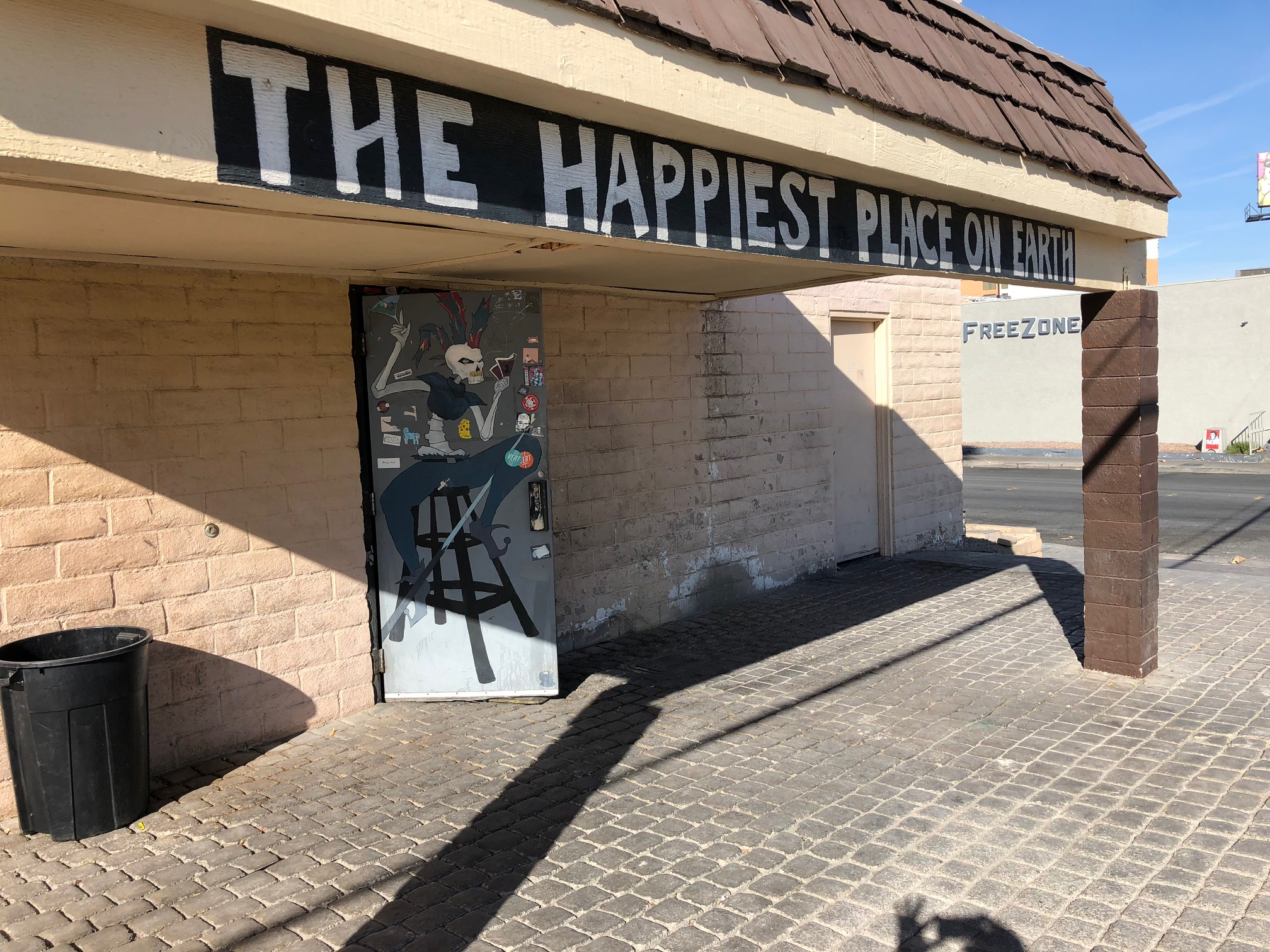
- Double Down Saloon in Las Vegas

- Location within Las Vegas Strip
- Address: 4640 Paradise Road
- Location: Las Vegas, Nevada, U.S.
- Coordinates: 36°6′20.03″N 115°9′1.01″W
- Owner: P Moss
- Type: Dive bar, live music venue

Construction
- Opened: 1992

Website
- www.doubledownsaloon.com

The Double Down Saloon is a dive bar and live music venue in Las Vegas, Nevada, United States. Founded by P Moss in 1992, it quickly became an off-Strip landmark known for its irreverent motto, "Shut Up and Drink", graffiti-covered walls, and unpolished charm. Famous for unconventional house specialties such as "Ass Juice" and the Bacon Martini, the bar has earned national media attention for its distinctive "anti-Vegas" ethos and significant role in the city's independent nightlife scene.

== History ==
The Double Down Saloon opened in 1992 under the direction of P Moss, a Chicago native. It is located on Paradise Road near Naples Drive, in what was then an enclave of gay bars called the "Fruit Loop", east of the Las Vegas Strip. The location initially struggled to attract customers, with cab drivers reportedly hesitant to make the trip.

Moss designed the venue to be unpretentious, affordable, and defiantly different from the city's ubiquitous sports bars and the Strip's opulent lounges. The venue's mix of live acts and no-frills atmosphere quickly established it as a hub for the city's punk, garage, and alternative music scenes. Its raw originality and independent character earned it international attention, and its ongoing identity remains closely associated with Moss's vision.

Moss later expanded his brand with the opening of Frankie's Tiki Room, the Triple Down Saloon, and a New York City outpost of the Double Down brand in the East Village.

== Atmosphere and clientele ==
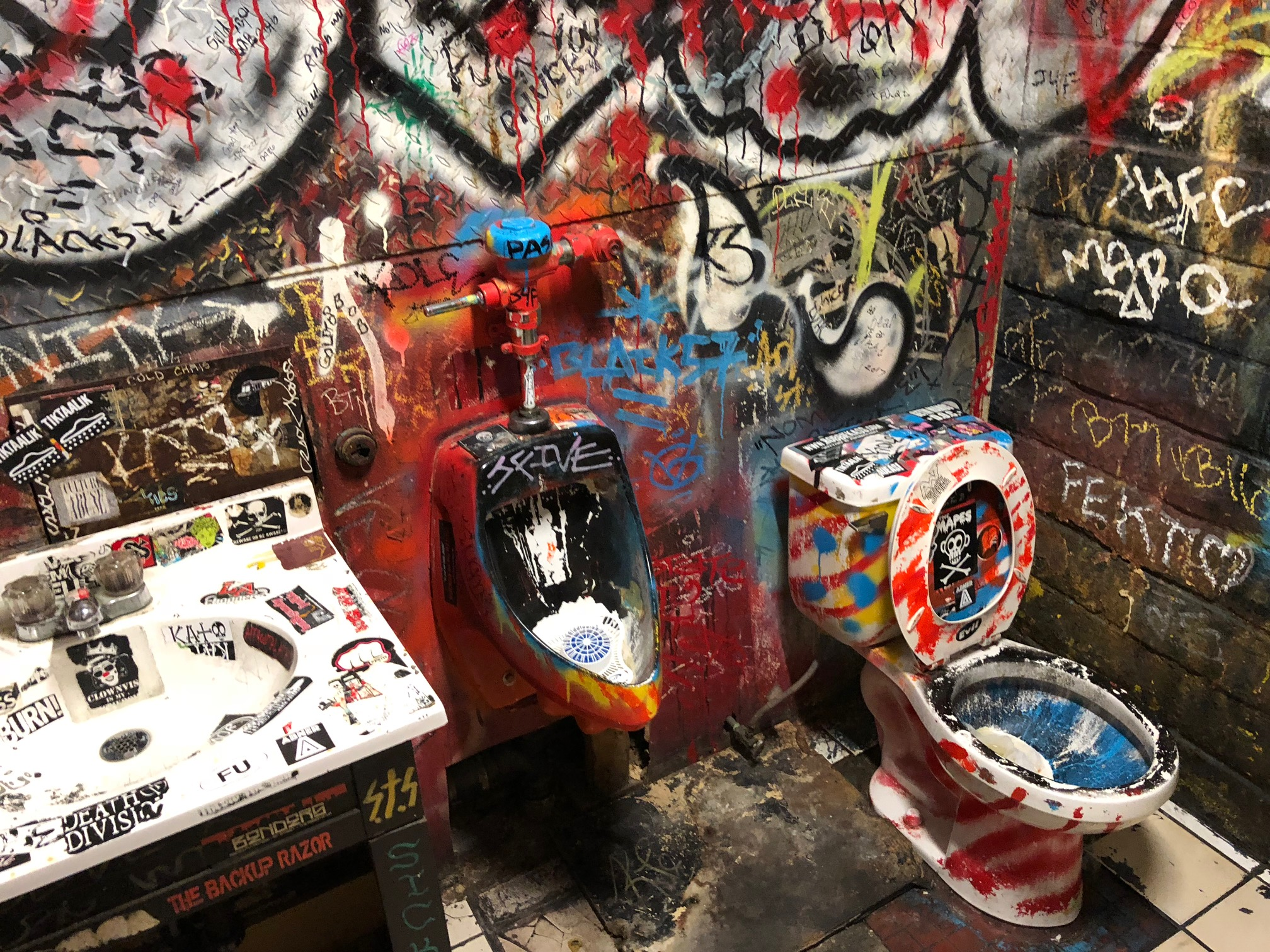
Double Down Saloon men's restroom

The Double Down Saloon is frequently cited as one of Las Vegas's quintessential dive bars, celebrated for its motto and a loud mix of punk, ska, surf, and psychobilly music.

The interior is an energetic collage of neon art, hand-painted signs, and layers of stickers and memorabilia, contributing to what Nevada Public Radio called "a study in chaos art." The bar also features a renowned jukebox, praised for its eclectic blend of local punk bands and Las Vegas standards. The televisions above the bar are typically tuned to a continuous reel of obscure and campy B-movie clips, curated to amplify what Moss has described as the bar's vibe of "shock and oddity." Even the bathrooms—intentionally left in a state of perpetual disrepair after earlier renovation attempts were vandalized—have become part of the bar's lore. The Times of India once advised travelers to "Avoid the restroom at all costs."

The bar's customer base is eclectic, mingling musicians, service-industry workers, and locals with tourists and occasional celebrities, forming a mix of "movie stars and crust punks." The atmosphere is underscored by a long-standing in-house joke known as "puke insurance," which allows patrons to pay a small upfront fee to reserve the right to vomit on the premises without being ejected—a practice cited as a tongue-in-cheek extension of the bar's rebellious culture.

== Live music and cultural influence ==
Since its earliest days, the Double Down Saloon has been a cornerstone of Las Vegas's punk and indie music community, hosting local performers and visiting bands in an intimate setting, without a cover charge. Its nightly programming spans multiple genres, providing a consistent platform for high-energy talent and contributing to the development of the city's off-Strip creative scene.

In 2022, Moss opened the Triple Down Saloon inside the Punk Rock Museum, described as a continuation of the Double Down's musical ethos and legacy.

== Signature drinks ==
The Double Down Saloon is best known for its offbeat house specialties, most notably the "Ass Juice" shot and the Bacon Martini. Served in a miniature toilet-shaped cup, the Ass Juice shot has no fixed recipe; bartenders typically combine assorted liquors into a potent brown concoction that has become a rite of passage for first-time guests.The Bacon Martini blends vodka infused with bacon fat and is typically garnished with a crispy strip of bacon. Invented by Moss in 1998, the drink is cited as one of the country's first bacon martini cocktails.

These beverages reflect the bar's contrarian approach to mixology and its embrace of humor, reinforcing its self-described identity as an "anti-cocktail bar."

== Cultural reception and recognition ==
The Double Down Saloon has been consistently recognized by local and national media as one of Las Vegas's most distinctive nightlife spots, appearing on multiple "best dive bar" lists, including those published by Las Vegas Weekly and the Las Vegas Review-Journal.

Prominent travel guides and publications have praised the bar. Anthony Bourdain presented the Double Down Saloon in his No Reservations Las Vegas episode and counted it among his favorite bars worldwide. Frommer's calls the Double Down "the antithesis of the city surrounding it." Fodor's recommends sightseers "go late, choke back the cigarette smoke, and try the [fabled] Ass Juice cocktail." Publications such as Rolling Stone, Playboy, and Maxim have praised its eccentric décor and no-frills drinks, often citing it as an authentic counterpoint to the Strip's corporate culture.

The bar offers a deliberately disorderly experience; its urban art walls, eccentric clientele, and atmosphere can be a surprise to travelers expecting an upscale lounge. However, for many patrons, these same qualities—its rough edges and unfiltered character—are precisely what define the Double Down as a Las Vegas institution.
