= Bacone =

American breakfast dish

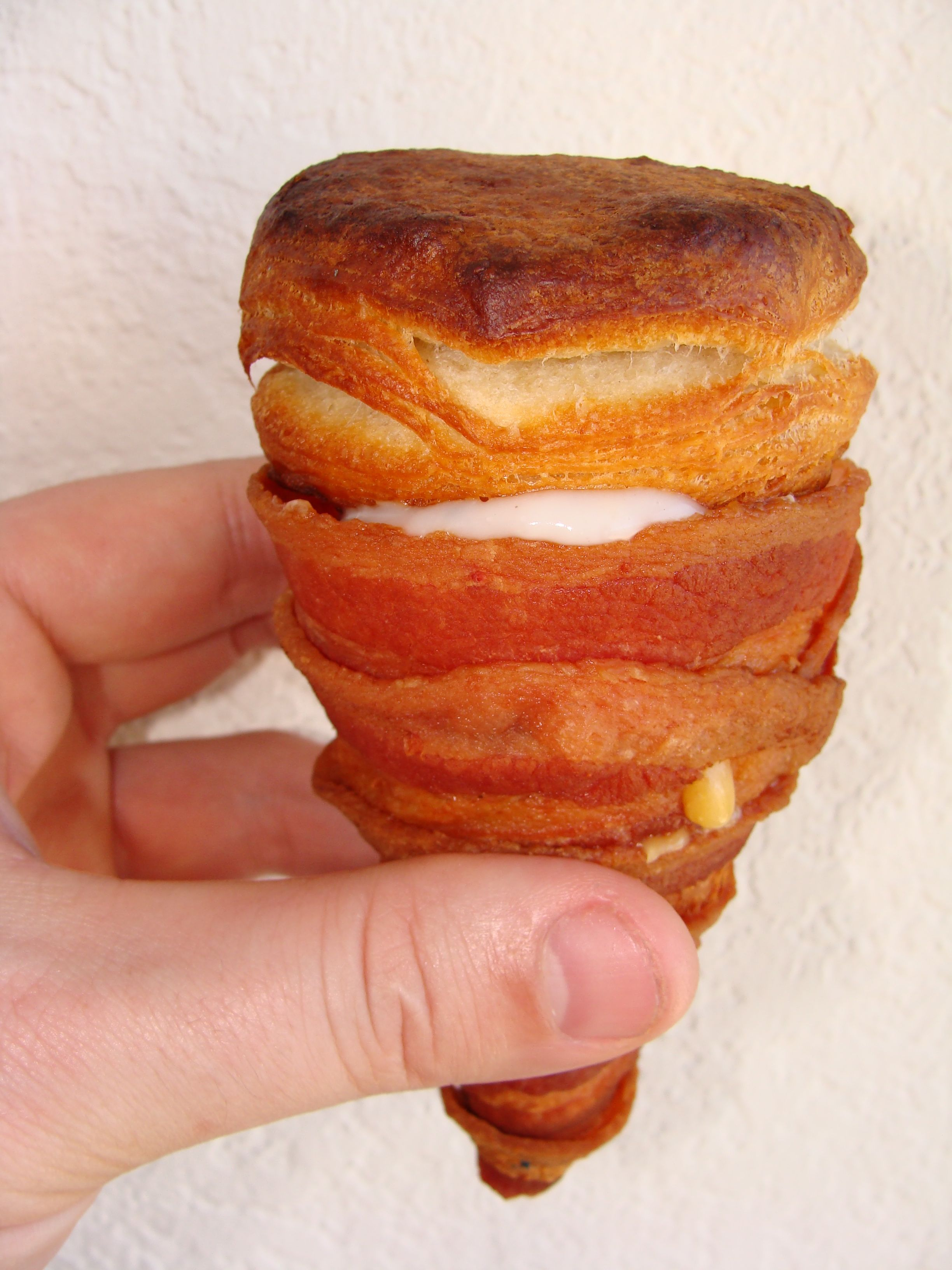
- A cone of curled bacon, filled with scrambled eggs, cheese, hash browns, topped with country gravy and a warm biscuit.
- Course: Main
- Place of origin: United States
- Region or state: California
- Created by: Christian Williams, Melissa Tillman
- Main ingredients: Bacon, scrambled eggs, cheese, hash browns, sausage gravy, biscuit

The Bacone is an American breakfast dish consisting of bacon shaped into a cone, filled with scrambled eggs, hash browns, and cheese and topped with a layer of sausage gravy and a biscuit. Inventors Christian Williams and Melissa Tillman debuted the Bacone at Bacon Camp 2009 in San Francisco, CA where it won the Judge's Choice award. Following its appearance at Bacon Camp, it garnered local and national media attention, including a mention in Gourmet Magazine, and a special segment on the Food Network channel, in the show What Would Brian Boitano Make?, where Williams showed Boitano how to make one.

== See also ==
- List of bacon dishes
