= Talli Osborne =

Canadian musician and public speaker

- Born: c. 1980 (Note: Sources vary on her age. It has been reported that she was 36 years old in either 2015 or 2017, and 42 years old in 2022.); Montreal, Quebec, Canada
- Occupations: Musician, public speaker

Talli Osborne (born c. 1980) is a Canadian punk rock musician and public speaker. Born without arms and some bones in her legs, Osborne has given motivational talks centred on her life experiences and topics such as body positivity at speaking events in Canada and the United States. She has performed with the bands NOFX, Lagwagon, and Against Me! since becoming involved in the Toronto punk community and gained fame after NOFX released a song about her in 2003. She was named spokesperson for the Punk Rock Museum in Las Vegas in 2022.

== Biography ==
Osborne was born c. 1980, in Montreal, Quebec, Canada. She was born without arms and some legbones, and she is less than 4 feet (1.2 m) tall. Osborne has stated that she does not prefer the term "disabled" as "[i]t implies that I'm not able to do things."

At her birth, the couple to whom Osborne was born chose not to raise her, so she resided in the hospital nursery for the first 13 months of her life until she was adopted by a couple in Ontario with one child. In a multi-racial adoptive family, Osborne would ultimately be one of 19 adoptive children, some of whom also had special needs. Her adoptive mother volunteered at an adoption agency, while her adoptive father was a mechanic. She recalls that, while she was growing up, all family members were expected to help with household tasks; for example, in mornings, she was tasked to clean litter boxes and floors. Osborne used prosthetic legs and arms in her youth, but stopped using prosthetic arms in high school to avoid the need of a teaching assistant. After moving away from her family to enter a social work program at Ryerson University in Toronto, she stopped wearing prosthetic legs as they felt uncomfortable. She later left Ryerson University without graduating. She began to volunteer for The War Amps, an organisation which assists amputees, when she was 13 years old.

Osborne's mobility scooter was stolen in 2005; she was donated a new one soon after. She was the target of online harassment in 2013 after a photo of her was published on Reddit. In late 2018, she filed a complaint regarding two Hamilton Police officers who arrived at the scene when she was hit by a car while riding a mobility scooter. She alleged mistreatment by the officers. Following her move to the United States, in 2024, she became the subject of news media after she obtained a driver's license through a seven-year effort costing almost $100,000, some of which was paid with the assistance of the War Amps. Her car, a used Mini Cooper, had modifications to its steering system, floor pedals, and seatbelt, and was fitted with a touchscreen allowing for control of gears and turn signals.

== Punk rock community ==
Active as a performer and concertgoer in the punk music scene, Osborne first gained an interest in punk rock in high school upon hearing a song by the band NOFX. As a vocalist, she performed in such venues as Toronto's Bovine Sex Club and opened for NOFX as part of the musical group named The Talliband. She has shared the stage with the bands Lagwagon and Against Me!. Vice magazine in 2015 called her a "fixture" of the local punk community in Toronto. She has also spoken on the issue of the accessibility of musical venues from her perspective as a concert performer and as an attendee.

External videos
- "She's Nubs" by NOFX

Osborne also goes by the nickname "Nubs", and has also led her own band named Nubs and Her Studs, in which she was the lead vocalist. Osborne had only briefly spoken to NOFX frontman Fat Mike at a concert some time before the band wrote a song about her, titled "She's Nubs", for their 2003 album The War on Errorism. The song led her to gain fame among fans of NOFX and other bands under the Fat Wreck Chords record label, and she began speaking to the general media. She explained her reaction to the song to Vice magazine in 2015:

A couple of months later [after meeting NOFX frontman Fat Mike] my friend had gotten a hold of an advanced copy of their [NOFX's] new album. He phoned me up and told me that he thought the band wrote a song about me and played me the song over the phone. At first I couldn't believe it. We had only talked for a bit so I looked up their email on the website and Fat Mike wrote me back from his AOL account. I guess I had left an impression. It was the ultimate compliment.

Fat Mike invited Osborne to become the spokesperson for the Punk Rock Museum in Las Vegas, which he had founded, in 2022. In her role, she acted as the museum's "customer service director" and was responsible for representing the museum at punk music events. She performed research on old concert posters to be pieced together in a large mural for one of the museum's exhibitions prior to the museum's opening in 2023.

== Speaking career ==
After leaving university, Osborne took a job at Virgin Mobile, where she ended up working for seven years in customer service and social media representative roles. In recognition of her customer service work, her employer rewarded her with a trip to the private island of Virgin Group CEO Richard Branson. She left her job at Virgin Mobile in 2014 to work full-time as a motivational speaker. Around that time, she moved to Hamilton, and soon after gave a talk at Supercrawl, an indie arts festival held in the city. CBC News featured her as one of "5 remarkable Hamilton women we met in 2014". She spoke on bullying and body positivity at the Toronto TEDx conference the following year. She has also spoken at universities and schools across the country and in the United States. In 2022, she was featured in a social media marketing campaign for the beauty retail company Sephora.
