= The Punk Rock Museum =

Museum

Coordinates: 36°9′14.544″N 115°9′37.85″W

- Established: April 1, 2023
- Location: 1422 Western Ave, Las Vegas, Nevada, US
- Founder: "Fat Mike" Burkett; Pat Smear
- Website: www.thepunkrockmuseum.com

The Punk Rock Museum is a 12,000-square-foot space dedicated to the punk rock music genre, which opened on April 1, 2023. Located in Las Vegas, Nevada, the museum was founded by "Fat Mike" Burkett of the band NOFX, and developed by Burkett and production manager Lisa Brownlee. It is governed by a ten-person collective of musicians and museum investors including Burkett, co-founder Pat Smear (The Germs), and skateboarder Tony Hawk.

== History ==
The Punk Rock Museum was founded by NOFX frontman Mike Burkett, also known as Fat Mike, and developed by Burkett and production manager Lisa Brownlee. It is governed by a ten-person collective of musicians and museum investors including Burkett, co-founder Pat Smear (The Germs), and skateboarder Tony Hawk. Burkett invited Canadian punk rock musician Talli Osborne to become the museum's spokesperson, who would be responsible for representing the museum at punk music events.

== Overview ==
The museum houses more than 1,000 artifacts documenting the history of the punk rock music genre from its birth to the present day. The exhibits, contributions by bands and members of the worldwide punk community, include fliers, artwork, clothing, and instruments used in recordings and on tours by notable punk musicians. Prominent features include molds for the signature helmets of Devo and a photograph of Nirvana's Kurt Cobain sitting on a couch, with the accompanying couch. Founder Burkett has stated the museum is planned as all-inclusive, inviting punk musicians globally to submit memorabilia, stating "We'll let anybody into our world unless you're really annoying. Or a rock star. You can't act like a rock star, because then you get kicked out." As of 2023, guided tours are offered by punk musicians themselves, including members of The Vandals, Social Distortion, and Less Than Jake. The museum plans to create travelling exhibitions of its collection in the future.

Housed inside the museum is The Triple Down, a sister dive bar to P. Moss' Double Down Saloon; The Jam Room, a room with donated musical instruments for visitors to utilize; and a chapel offered for weddings and wakes. There is also the Wall of Insignificant and Unknown Bands, where punk bands of any background are invited to post their band fliers.
