= Bacon soft drink =

Bacon-flavored beverage

Lester's Fixins Bacon Soda on a shelf with other flavors

Bacon soft drinks are soft drink beverages with the flavor of bacon. Several US companies produce bacon soda brands, including Jones Soda, Lockhart Smokehouse and Rocket Fizz.

== Manufacturers ==
Jones Soda and J&D's Down Home Enterprises, both based in Seattle, Washington, collaborated to produce a bacon-flavored drink that has ten calories per serving. Real bacon is not used in its preparation, and it is a vegetarian product. Creation of the flavor took several months of work to accomplish, in attempts to mimic the flavor of bacon. Esquire magazine has described it as having a dark red color with a strong bacon odor and a strong sweetness derived from artificial sweetener. In a taste test survey conducted by Epicurious for Jones Soda bacon-flavored soft drinks, overall totals from taste testers (using a 1-to-10 scale with 10 being the highest) equated to "Fragrance: 2.02, Flavor: 1.58, Bacony-ness: 4.57 and Overall: 1.76". In November 2010, the company's marketing director, Mike Spear, stated "We felt it was our duty as leaders in the premium soda category to carbonate bacon’s salty goodness." Jones Soda markets their bacon soda as part of a package that includes other bacon-flavored products, including bacon-flavored lip balm, popcorn, gravy and salt. The company also bottles and produces other meat-flavored sodas, such as turkey and gravy.

Lockhart Smokehouse in Dallas, Texas produces a brand of bacon-flavored soft drinks named Meat Maniac. It has been described as having a synthetic bacon flavor and as creamy and sweet. The product has no animal products on its ingredient list.

Rocket Fizz, a franchise of candy stores with its flagship store in Camarillo, California, produces a bacon-flavored soft drink under their brand name Lester's Fixins that is named Bacon Soda. In 2012, the owner of the Rocket Fizz store in Denver, Colorado stated that bacon drinks are the store's best-selling soft drinks. Rocket Fizz also produces ranch dressing-flavored, buffalo wing-flavored, and dog drool-flavored drinks, among others.

== See also ==
- Bacon mania
- Bacon martini
- Bacon vodka
- BLT cocktail
- List of brand name soft drinks products
- List of soft drink flavors
- Mitch Morgan
