= Adrian Anantawan =

Canadian violinist (born 1983)

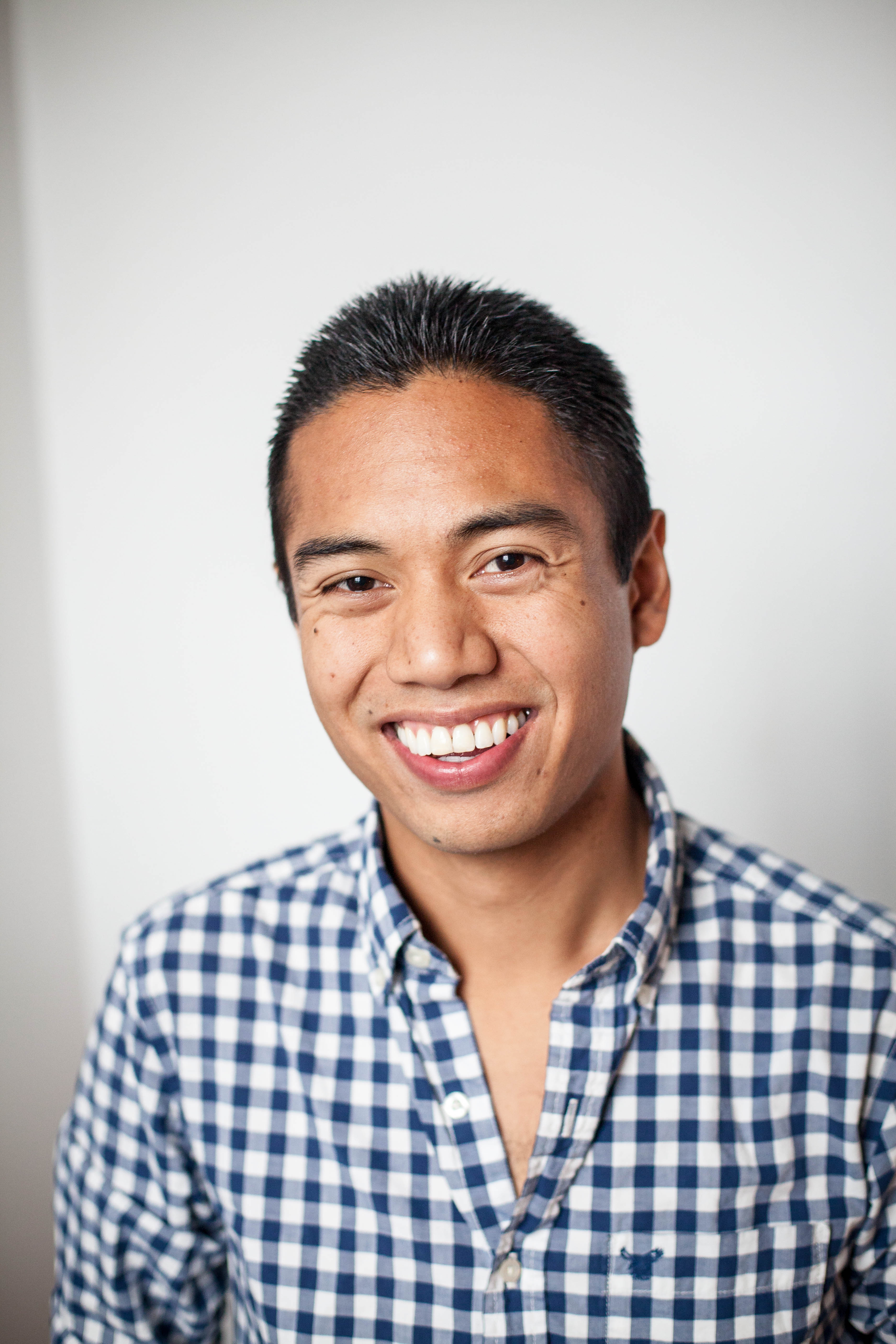

Background information
- Born: 1983 (age 42–43); Mississauga, Ontario, Canada
- Genre: Classical music
- Occupation: Musician
- Instrument: Violin
- Years active: 1999–Present

Adrian Anantawan is a Canadian violinist and music educator. He was born without a right hand and uses a prosthetic device to hold his violin bow. Anantawan, who began studying violin at age nine, has performed with the Toronto Symphony Orchestra and at the White House. He is an alumnus of the Etobicoke School of the Arts in Canada, the Curtis Institute of Music in Philadelphia, Yale University and the Harvard Graduate School of Education. He was a scholarship recipient of the Anne-Sophie Mutter Foundation from 2009 to 2013 and is the Chair of Music at Milton Academy and artistic director of Shelter Music Boston.

== Biography ==
Anantawan was born in Canada to a Thai father and a Hongkonger mother. Anantawan grew up in Toronto and began his violin training, at the age of nine, in Mississauga with violinist Peggy Hills, and later under violist Mark Childs in Toronto.

In 1999 and 2000, Anantawan was among the youngest members of the National Youth Orchestra of Canada.

Anantawan's performances and use of a prosthetic device to play the violin have been covered by Canadian broadcasters, including CBC and CTV. In 2001, Anantawan received the Mississauga Arts Council Emerging Music Talent award and the YTV (Canada) Young Achiever award. In 2002, he received the Starling Award for promising young soloist from the Meadowmount School of Music, founded by Ivan Galamian. In the same year, he won the International Rosemary Kennedy Award and debuted at the Kennedy Center, Washington D.C. In 2005, he received the CBC Galaxie Rising Star Award.

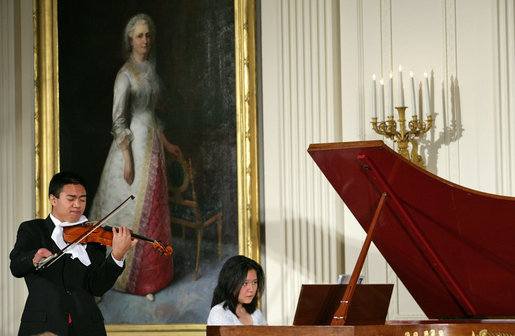
Adrian Anantawan and Amy Yang perform during the announcement of the President's Global Cultural Initiative in the East Room, September 25, 2006

In the summers of 2004, 2005 and 2006, Anantawan received scholarships to the National Arts Centre's Young Artists Program and studied with Pinchas Zukerman. In 2006, Anantawan graduated from the Curtis Institute of Music in Philadelphia, where he studied with Ida Kavafian and Yumi Ninomiya Scott. Anantawan also spent two summers studying with Itzhak Perlman at a residency program in Shelter Island, New York.

Anantawan has been performing regularly since 2001. He soloed with orchestras throughout Canada and the US. He represented the Canada Cultural Showcase at the 2004 Paralympic Games in Athens, Greece and at the Opening Ceremonies of the Vancouver Winter Games in 2010. In November 2005, he debuted with the Toronto Symphony under the direction of Peter Oundjian. In the spring of 2006, his recital at the Glenn Gould Studio for CBC Radio 2 - "Music Around Us" was broadcast live nationally. In September 2006 he performed at the White House to help launch the President's Global Cultural Initiative.

Anantawan has also performed for Pope John Paul II, Christopher Reeve and the Dalai Lama.

In 2008, Anantawan received a Master of Music degree from Yale University, where he studied with Peter Oundjian. Anantawan was inducted into Terry Fox Hall of Fame in 2008, Toronto. From 2008 to 2013, he was on the pre-college faculty of the National Arts Centre's Summer Music Institute.

Anantawan is the subject of the documentary The Story Behind the Notes.

== Disability activism ==
Anantawan was born without a right hand. He is an active member and spokesperson for the CHAMP (Child Amputee) Program of The War Amps and Bloorview Kids Rehab Center in Toronto. Anantawan worked with musician Eric Wan on a project using the Virtual Music Instrument, software that Wan controlled through head movements. In 2011, Wan used it to perform Pachelbel's Canon in D with the Montreal Chamber Orchestra.

- White House appearance in the presence of the First Lady to help launch the Global Cultural Initiative, sponsored by VSA arts, 2006
- Juno Nominee for Best Children Album "A Butterfly in Time", 2006
- National broadcast of TSO debut concert by CBC, January 1, 2006
- Nominee for Terry Fox Hall of Fame, 2005
- Starling Award for Most Promising Young Soloist, 2005
- Awarded the use of a 1698 Amati violin, 2004 – present
- Gold, and Grand Awards, International Mercury Film Festival, 2003 (profile)
- Gold, and Gold Special Jury's Awards, Worldfest, Houston, 2003 (profile)
- VSA arts Rosemary Kennedy International Young Soloist Award, 2002
- Kids Hall of Fame Inductee, N.Y., 2001
- Young Achiever Award YTV (YAPS to the Max), 2001
- Mississauga Art Council Emerging Music Award, 2001
- Member of NYO of Canada, placed second in the nationwide audition, 2000
- One of the youngest violinists accepted by the NYO of Canada, 1999
