= Rocket Fizz =

US chain of candy stores

- Industry: Franchise chain of candy stores in the United States
- Founded: 2007; 19 years ago in Camarillo, California
- Founder: Robert Powells; Ryan Morgan
- Number of locations: 103 (as of January 2025)
- Key people: Rich Shane (CEO)
- Products: Candies and its own line of soft drinks
- Website: www.rocketfizz.com

Rocket Fizz is an American franchise chain of novelty bottled soft drinks and candy stores. The company markets a diverse variety of candies and produces its own soda pop line offering unique flavors. Its flagship store, which opened in 2009, two years after the company was founded, was located in Camarillo, California but closed in 2019. The company also markets candies that are rare to find or in limited production by various manufacturers, such as those that were popular during the 1960s to 1980s. As of November 2018, there are 91 Rocket Fizz store locations in the United States and two in Canada.

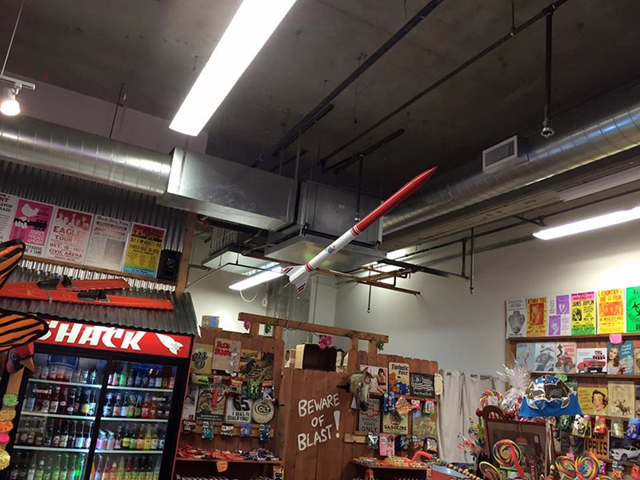
View inside the Portland, Oregon Rocket Fizz location. Circa 2015

== Products ==
Rocket Fizz specializes in candy and soft drink products. For example, the franchise store in Beaverton, Oregon markets over 4,000 varieties of candy and over 500 varieties of soda drinks. The company's franchise store in Cary, North Carolina markets over 1,200 varieties of candy and over 430 varieties of soft drinks. Some of the company's beverages have been described as "novelty soft drinks".

The company's soda products are marketed under the brand name Rocket Fizz. A popular soda they produce is bacon soda. At the company's Denver, Colorado store, bacon soda was described as the store's best-selling soda in 2012. The variety of soft drinks offered by Rocket Fizz has been described by Indianapolis Monthly magazine as "overwhelming", and the quantity of candies offered was described as "copious amounts".

In 2017, the chain began rollout of a line of sodas as part of a marketing deal with the band KISS; as of September 2017, the line consisted of Destroyer Kola, KISS Army root beer and Rock And Roll Over Cherry Kola.

Rocket Fizz also produces ranch dressing-flavored soda, buffalo wing-flavored soda, coffee soda and one named dog drool, among others.

The company also markets novelty items such as retro memorabilia and prank gifts.

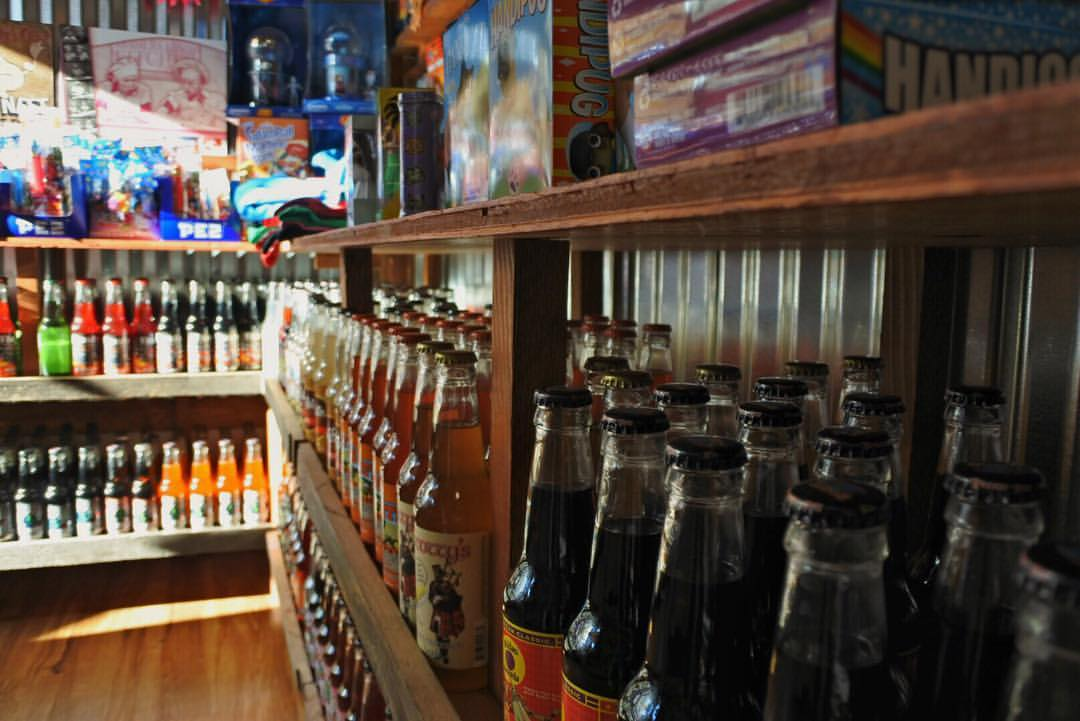
View inside the Indianapolis, Indiana Rocket Fizz location

== Locations ==
As of November 2018, there are 91 locations. Rocket Fizz has store locations in the U.S. states of Arizona, Arkansas, California, Colorado, Florida, Georgia, Illinois, Indiana, Iowa, Kansas, Louisiana, Michigan, Missouri, Nebraska, Nevada, New Jersey, New York, North Carolina, Ohio, Oklahoma, Oregon, Pennsylvania, South Carolina, Tennessee, Texas, Utah, Virginia, Washington and Wyoming. There are also two locations in Alberta, Canada.

== See also ==
- Jones Soda – a company that sometimes produces unique flavors of soft drinks
