= Jambonneau =

Part of a leg of pork or ham

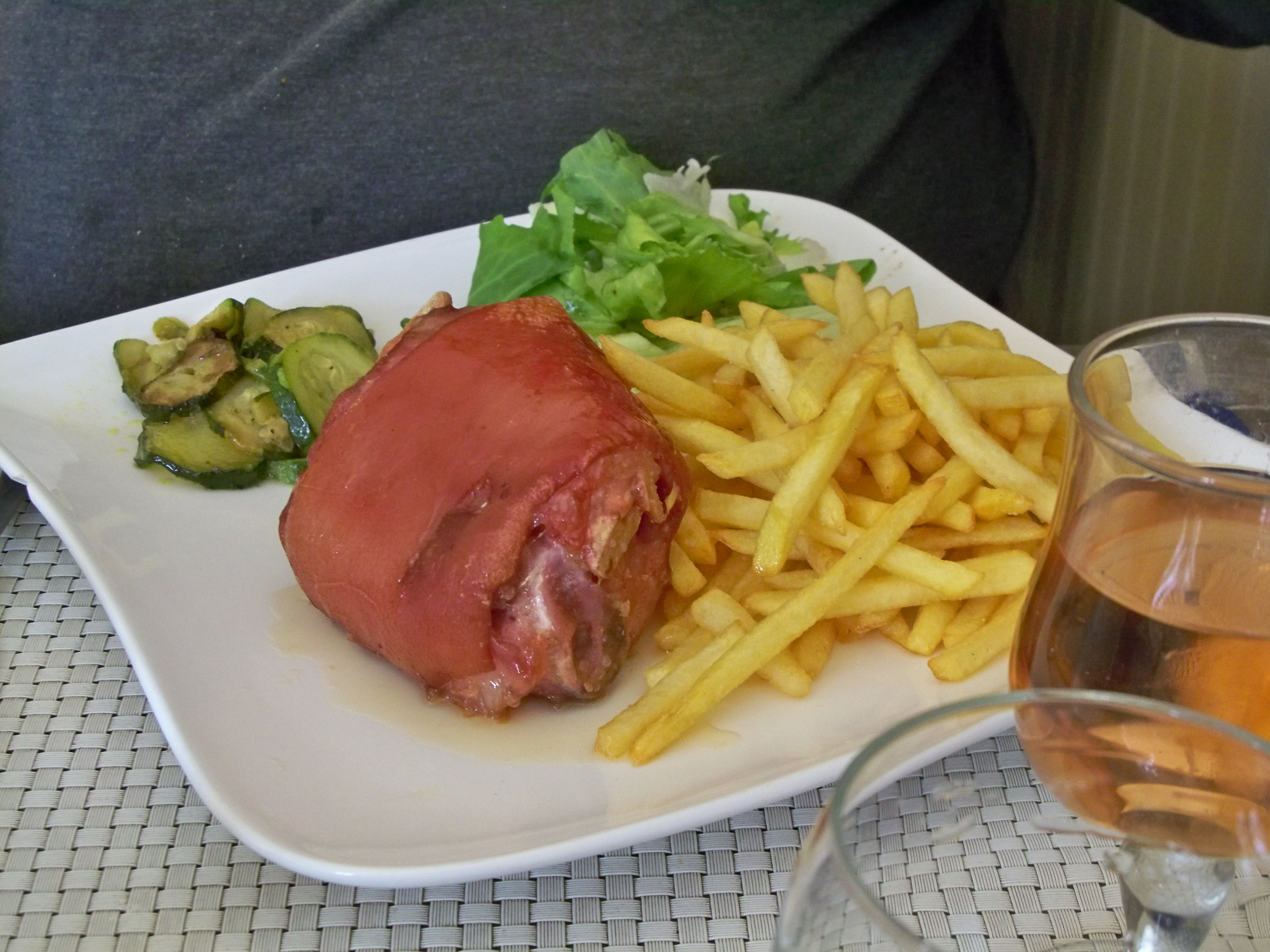
- Place of origin: France
- Serving temperature: Fresh, salted or smoked
- Main ingredients: Leg of pork or ham
- Variations: Chicken

Jambonneau is a French culinary term for the knuckle end of a leg of pork or ham. It is consumed fresh, salted or smoked. In addition, after braising or poaching, jambonneau is traditionally served with sauerkraut or used in soups.

The same term may also be used for a chicken thigh that has been stuffed, usually with forcemeat, shaped like a ham and braised. Such a preparation is called jambonneau as it has a shape similar to the pork or ham form.
