= Baconnaise =

Brand of bacon-flavored condiment

Baconnaise (Regular)
- Plastic jar of Baconnaise

Nutritional value per 13 g
- Energy: 80 kcal (330 kJ)
- Carbohydrates: 1 g
- Sugars: 0 g
- Dietary fiber: 0 g
- Fat: 9 g
- Saturated: 1.5 g
- Trans: 0 g
- Protein: 0 g
Vitamins and minerals
Minerals	Quantity %DV^{†}
Sodium	4% 85 mg
- ^{†}Percentages estimated using US recommendations for adults. Source: Baconnaise on company website

Baconnaise is a bacon-flavored, mayonnaise-based food spread that is ovo vegetarian and kosher certified. It was created by Justin Esch and Dave Lefkow, founders of J&D's Foods, in November 2008, and sold 40,000 jars within six months. It was test-marketed in Grand Forks, North Dakota, to determine consumer interest. After being featured on both The Daily Show and The Oprah Winfrey Show, sales of Baconnaise increased significantly, with more than a million jars sold.

== History ==
In an interview with ABC News, Esch and Lefkow stated that they came up with the original idea for bacon products and their first invention, Bacon Salt, while making a joke about the subject over a meal at a diner. The money for their startup came from the $5000 that Lefkow had obtained while on America's Funniest Home Videos. The idea to make bacon spreadable came from a customer's request. Together, they created interest in their products by going to numerous sporting events dressed in bacon costumes and used social networking sites to raise awareness of their company.

Baconnaise has been featured on The Daily Show with Jon Stewart several times as a repeat joke. In 2009, Jon Stewart used it in a skit that drew negative attention from Seattle Post-Intelligencer's Leslie Kelly. Stewart commented, "Baconnaise, for people who want to get heart disease but, you know, too lazy to actually make bacon." In 2010, Jon Stewart again lampooned Baconnaise with a fake clip of the billboard in Times Square that drew a response from J&D's Foods. According to J&D's Foods, a plan to run an actual billboard ad was made, but it was declined by Comedy Central. Using it as a prop in a later episode, Stewart referred to Baconnaise as "capitalism's greatest triumph".

Baconnaise was discussed on The Oprah Winfrey Show on April 24, 2009, when Esch and Lefkow were interviewed by Winfrey via Skype. After her guests and she ate sandwiches that used the product, she commented, "Vegetarian and kosher! Thanks Justin and Dave! Get your own Baconnaise!" After her endorsement, the traffic on the company website and telephones overwhelmed its systems. Lefkow stated that a year after the show aired over a million jars of Baconnaise were sold.

== Production ==
According to Lefkow, "spreadable bacon" came as a suggestion from customers after their success with Bacon Salt. Lefkow stated that developing and refining the taste of Baconnaise resulted in him having "nothing but bacon and mayonnaise for breakfast for the next six months" to compare their product to the real thing. They initially sold the new product via Pike's Place's City Fish Company.

Baconnaise contains no bacon, artificial flavors, or MSG, but the actual process and ingredients in the product are a trade secret. A complete list of the ingredients includes: soybean oil, water, egg yolk, gluconic acid, yeast extract, stabilizer (microcrystalline cellulose, modified food starch, xanthan gum, guar gum, gum arabic), cultured dextrose, salt, sugar, dehydrated garlic, paprika, dehydrated onion, spice, natural smoke flavor, natural flavors, tocopherols, calcium disodium EDTA, and autolyzed yeast extract.

J&D's Foods also released a light version of Baconnaise. Marketed as Baconnaise Lite, it contains 30 Cal per serving and less fat than the original Baconnaise. Baconnaise is sold in 15-oz (443-ml) plastic jars. In 2018 Baconnaise packaging was changed into a 15 Ounce squeeze bottle. The brand, J&D's remains the same however it is now owned by L and L Specialty Foods.

== Release ==
The product's marketing test was at Pike Place Market in Seattle, where it sold up to 120 jars a week. The product debuted in October 2008, at the Seattle Semi Pro Wrestling League in the Heaven's Night Club. The event featured a costumed fight between mayonnaise and a slab of bacon.

== Reception ==
Will Goldfarb of the website Serious Eats reviewed Baconnaise, stating, "[it] works fairly well as a sandwich condiment, but the assertive smokiness can overpower mild ingredients." Goldfarb recommended it as a sandwich condiment, but cautioned against using it in dips, salad dressings, and fish dishes. The "Baconnaise Lite" was met with a positive review from "Hungry Girl", though the reviewer noted its name was "a bit of an oxymoron". Baconnaise, while being both vegetarian and kosher-friendly, does not taste like mayonnaise.

=== Original recipes ===
Original recipes featuring animal fat-infused mayonnaise, including Baconnaise, were covered on the Serious Eats website. The recipe includes crumbled bacon strips, liquid rendered bacon fat, canola oil, egg yolks, and Dijon mustard with water and lemon juice.

== See also ==
- List of bacon substitutes
- List of mayonnaises
- Mayonnaise
