= Bacon vodka =

Alcoholic Drink

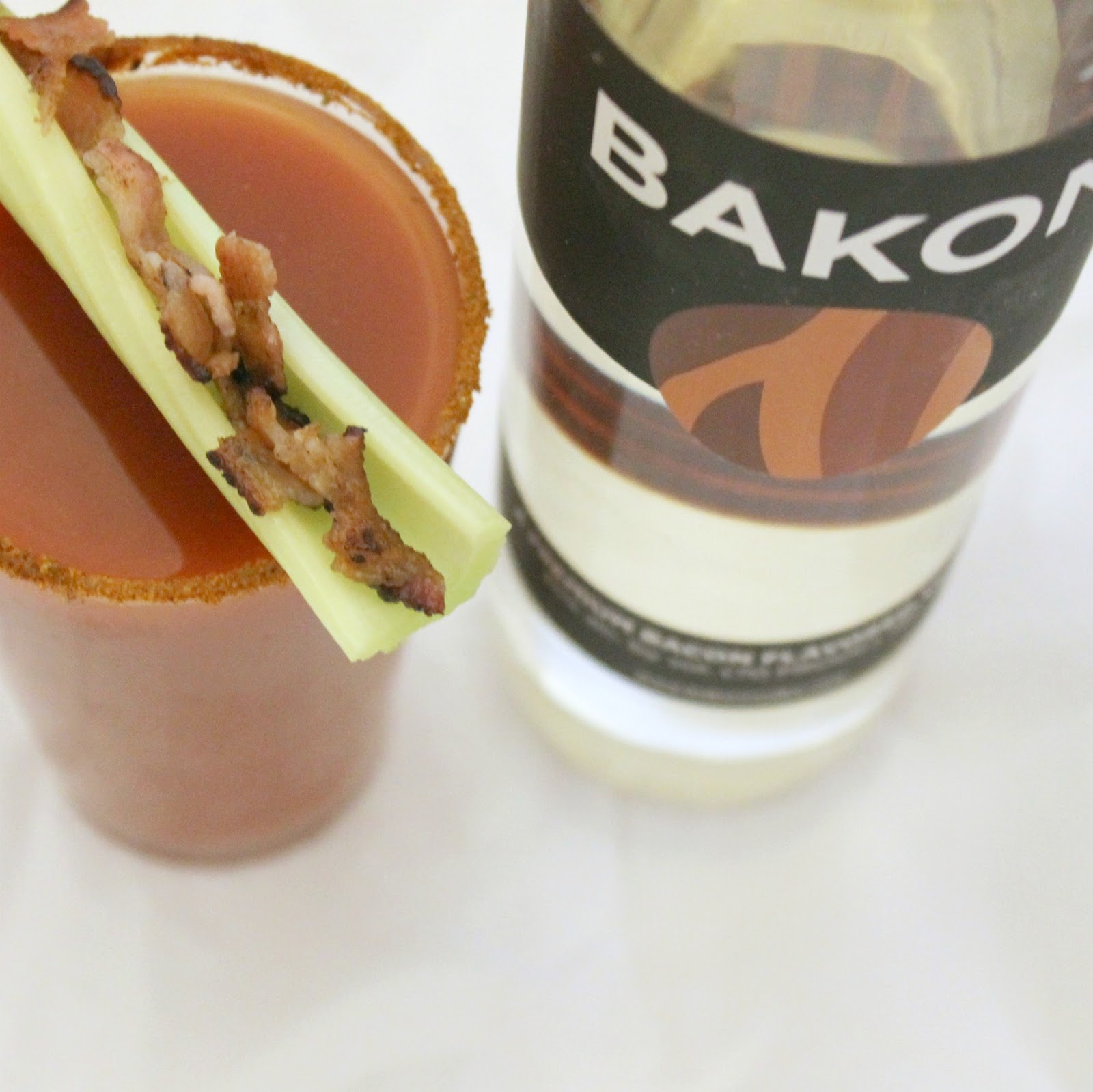
A "Bacon Bloody Mary" made with Bakon Vodka, a commercially available bacon-flavored vodka.

Bacon vodka is vodka infused with bacon flavor and the addition of savory flavor to mixed drinks. The infused alcohol can be sipped but is typically used in mixed drinks such as the Bloody Mary or bacon martini.

== History and commercial availability ==
Meat-infused beverages are not new to the cocktail world; one example is the "Bull Shot", a favorite of Ernest Hemingway, at Harry's Bar, in Venice, Italy, in the 1940s. These types of drinks have been referenced by writers as far back as the 17th century, including by John Locke and Samuel Pepys, who imbibed and wrote about savory-infused ales. A handful of bars and mixologists have been making bacon or other meat-infused cocktails for years, including the Double Down Saloon in Las Vegas and New York, which makes a Bacon Martini and Please Don't Tell in New York City, where the Benton's Old Fashioned was introduced in 2008. Smirnoff introduced bacon-flavored shots on a limited basis in selected bars and pubs. Unlike some, these were vegetarian-friendly. Mainstream interest in bacon vodka has been further driven by a pop-cultural interest in bacon, often called bacon mania.

In April 2009, Seattle-based Black Rock Spirits released a commercial vodka with a simulated bacon flavor, named "Bakon Vodka". Bakon contains no actual bacon or animal product of any kind, and is vegetarian. Following the trend, Heritage Distilling Company of Roslyn, Washington produced a bacon vodka that is, like Bakon, vegetarian, though distilled from grapes instead of potato.

== Homemade versions ==
Bacon-flavored spirit infusions can be made by adding liquid rendered bacon fat, stirring, freezing and then removing the solidified fat off the top. The process is known as 'fat-washing'.

== See also ==
- Bacon soda
- BLT cocktail
- Mitch Morgan
- 2010s in food
