= Cultured dextrose =

Food additive

Cultured dextrose is a food additive used to inhibit the growth of undesirable bacteria and mold in food. Often used in place of benzoates and sorbates, it is considered by some consumers to be a more "natural" ingredient, because it is prepared by the fermentation of milk or sugar powders by the probiotic bacteria Propionibacterium freudenreichii and Lactococcus lactis, both of which are extensively used in the production of cheese and other dairy products.

Cultured dextrose consists of a mixture of fermentation metabolites, including butyric, propionic and lactic acids and small peptides. As sold, it is an off-white powder.

Cultured dextrose is marketed under several trade names including bioVONTAGE from Third Wave Bioactives and MicroGARD by Danisco, a unit of DuPont. These ingredients are used in a range of foods including dairy products, salad dressings, and baked goods.
