= Mitch Morgan =

Cocktail made with bourbon whiskey and bacon

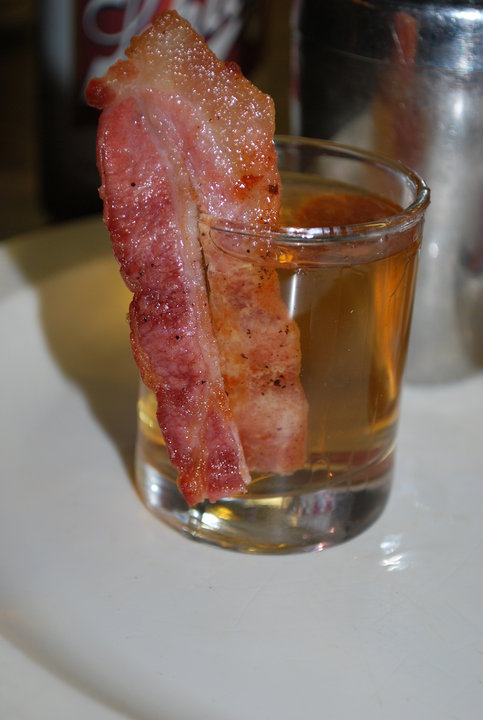
- A Mitch Morgan
- Type: Cocktail
- Ingredients: 5cl Bourbon; strip of bacon (garnish)
- Base spirit: Bourbon whiskey
- Standard drinkware: Shot glass
- Standard garnish: Bacon
- Served: Straight up: chilled, without ice

A Mitch Morgan is a cocktail that consists of a shot of bourbon whiskey served with a piece of fried bacon as a cocktail garnish and served in a glass coated on the inside with a thin veneer of bacon grease.

The Mitch Morgan is a popular beverage at the Oak the New Fat Alley Barbecue in Telluride, Colorado, where the drink originated. The Mitch Morgan is named after its creator. The drink served as the inspiration for J&D's Down Home Enterprises' popular product Bacon Salt.

== Outside Telluride ==
On October 28, 2008, Mitch Morgan shots were served at a charity fund-raising event at Heavens night club in Seattle, Washington hosted by J&D's Foods. The event was promoted as "The World's First Charity No Holds Barred Battle To The Death Mayonnaise Wrestling Match" and promoted the launch of J&D's new products Baconnaise and Bacon Lip Balm, the money raised benefited the family of a deceased co-worker. The Mitch Morgans consisted of Maker's Mark bourbon and bacon from the "Bacon is Meat Candy Bacon Club." The fund-raiser sold over 1,000 Mitch Morgans, with customers requesting additional slices of the "gourmet bacon" to complement their drink.

Mitch Morgan shots were also served at J&D's Foods 2009 charity product launch party The Bacathlon. Hosted on November 19, 2009, The Bacathlon was promoted as The World's First Bacon-Themed Multi-Sport Athletic and Endurance Event that featured an attempt to set the World Record for Bacon Eating. The event promoted the launch of J&D's new products BaconPOP, Bacon Ranch and Mmmvelopes; the money raised benefited Ashley's Team.

== Varieties on the theme ==
The Mitch Morgan is not the only combination of liquor and bacon. Riding the wave of recent bacon mania, Colum Egan, the master distiller for Bushmills, issued a challenge to bartenders in New York City, for Saint Patrick's Day in 2008, to concoct drinks based on the traditional Irish breakfast, which of course includes bacon. Two drinks were singled out by The New York Times: Jim Meehan of PDT made a drink which consisted of bacon-infused Bushmills combined with maple syrup, orange and lemon juice, and a whole egg; Eben Freeman of Tailor employed bacon-infused Bushmills, served with roasted tomato gelée squares, a poached quail egg yolk, Irish breakfast-tea foam, and crispy black-pudding bits.

== Inspiration for Bacon Salt ==
In October 2007 Justin Esch (the co-founder of J&D's Down Home Enterprises) and his older brother Christopher Esch were talking about their fondness of Mitch Morgan shots with friends at the Jewish wedding of a childhood friend in New York, some of whom maintained a Kosher diet, which prohibits the consumption of pork products. The Esch brothers discussed the universal appeal of bacon and determined the world needed a bacon-flavored seasoning salt that could capture the deliciousness of bacon without the dietary issues, resulting in the development of Bacon Salt.

== See also ==
- Bacon soda
- Bacon vodka
- BLT cocktail
- List of cocktails
