= J&D's Down Home Enterprises =

American food company

- Industry: Foodstuffs
- Founded: July 2007
- Founder: Justin Esch; Dave Lefkow
- Fate: Sold
- Headquarters: Seattle, Washington, USA
- Products: Bacon Salt, Baconnaise
- Owner: L and L Specialty Foods (since 2017)
- Website: www.jdfoods.net

J&D's Down Home Enterprises, also known as J&D's Foods, was an American company founded in 2007 by entrepreneurs Justin Esch and Dave Lefkow to produce vegetarian based, bacon-related products such as Bacon Salt and Baconnaise. In November 2017, the company was purchased by L and L Specialty Foods, based in Altura, Minnesota.

== History ==
The company was founded in 2007 by entrepreneurs Justin Esch and Dave Lefkow. The company's initial product, Bacon Salt, was conceived by Esch while considering the virtues of the drink Mitch Morgan, which is composed of a shot of bourbon and a piece of fried bacon as a garnish. After registering a trademark and purchasing an internet domain, Esch and Lefkow started producing Bacon Salt. They funded their company with a $5,000 loan from Lefkow's 3-year-old son Dean, who had won the money on America's Funniest Home Videos for a video in which he smacks his dad with a hit while playing T-Ball. Bacon Salt became a hit, and as of 2007 was sold in all 50 states and 26 other countries. Esch and Lefkow have since repaid the $5,000 loan.

== Marketing ==
Initially Esch and Lefkow had no advertising budget and were met by resistance from food brokers and distributors who were unwilling to take a chance on an unknown product. Instead of traditional advertising, they sent jars of Bacon Salt to editors of food blogs and set up online profiles for Bacon Salt for online communities including MySpace and Facebook. The technique worked, and Esch and Lefkow received 800 orders in the first week for their three varieties (original, hickory, and peppered) which included an order from a customer in Texas for 36 jars. They sold 20,000 jars between their opening in July 2007 and November 2007. In addition to online marketing, Esch and Lefkow spent an average of 30 minutes per day phoning the media, and explaining why they should do a story about them.

=== Mayonnaise Wrestling ===
On October 28, 2008, J&D's Foods hosted The World's First Charity No Holds Barred Battle To The Death Mayonnaise Wrestling Match at Heavens night club in Seattle, Washington. The event featured three bouts of wrestling in 200 gallons of mayonnaise inside a ring made of old mattresses and hay bales. The main event included a fight between combatants dressed in a 7' foam Bacon suit and a giant jar of Mayonnaise. The event promoted the launch of their new bacon-flavored mayonnaise, Baconnaise, and funds raised benefited the family of a deceased co-worker. J&D's hosted a complimentary BLT sandwich bar served $3 Mitch Morgan shots made with Maker's Mark bourbon.

=== The Bacathlon ===
On November 19, 2009, J&D's Foods hosted The Bacathlon at Heavens night club in Seattle, Washington. Promoted as The World's First Bacon-Themed Multi-Sport Athletic and Endurance Event that featured an attempt to set the World Record for Bacon Eating. The Bacathlon featured local Seattle personalities competing against each other dressed in giant foam Bacon suits. The competitors included Ben Dragavon from Seattle Sounders FC, Mark Rahner from ROTTEN Comics, Thee Ted Smith from KISW 99.9 FM, Josh Black a.k.a. Ronald McFondle from Seattle Semi-Pro Wrestling, Justin Barnes from KFNK 104.9 FM, Sheeza Brickhouse from the Rat City Rollergirls, Erik "The Red" Denmark from Major League Eating and Jessica Williams the J&D's Foods Fall 2009 intern. J&D's once again served $3 Mitch Morgan shots made with Maker's Mark bourbon.

=== Novelty Products ===
J&D's Foods has used novelty bacon-flavored products Bacon Lip Balm, baconlube, Mmmvelopes, BaconAir, Bacon Coffins, Bacon Baby Formula and bacon soda to generate media buzz and spread the awareness of their mainstream consumer products.

== Products ==
J&D's markets a variety of bacon-flavored products, including:

=== Bacon Salt ===
Bacon Salt was the first product developed by J&D's Foods. The first attempt at making bacon salt was to take bacon grease and pour it over kosher salt. That attempt result was unsuccessful and, according to Esch, tasted disgusting. Upon perfecting the recipe, the pair introduced the first three flavors of Bacon Salt — Original, Hickory and Peppered varieties. J&D's went on to launch Natural Bacon Salt and the Limited Edition Holiday Flavors Cheddar, Jalapeño, Maple, Applewood and Mesquite Bacon Salt in 2008. Bacon Salt is vegetarian and kosher. Hickory Bacon Salt is vegan.

In 2008, J&D's Foods launched "Operation Bacon Salt" to provide Bacon Salt to troops serving abroad in Iraq and Afghanistan where pork is not readily available. After receiving several emails from troops stationed abroad J&D's began mailing free Bacon Salt to troops.

=== Baconnaise ===
Introduced in October 2008, Baconnaise is a bacon-flavored mayonnaise spread available in both Regular and Lite versions. Jon Stewart of The Daily Show described Baconnaise as being "for people who want heart disease but are too lazy to actually make the bacon."

=== Bacon Lip Balm ===
Introduced in October 2008, Bacon Lip Balm is a bacon-flavored lip balm. J&D's bacon-inspired lip balm, which is a "hot seller" on their web site, having sold over 50,000 units, often by the dozen. Customer reviews range from being described as the worst thing they have ever heard of to the greatest thing ever. When Esch and Lefkow appeared on The Oprah Winfrey Show in March 2009, Winfrey's co-hosts Mark Consuelos and Ali Wentworth applied Bacon Lip Balm during the interview.

=== BaconPOP ===
Introduced in November 2009, BaconPOP is a bacon-flavored microwave popcorn.

=== Bacon Ranch ===
Introduced in November 2009, Bacon Ranch is a bacon-flavored ranch dip/mix, to be combined with buttermilk, sour cream and/or mayonnaise.

=== Mmmvelopes ===
Introduced in November 2009, Mmmvelopes are bacon-flavored envelopes that both look like pieces of bacon and taste like bacon when licked.

== See also ==
- Bacon mania
