= The Whole Beast =

2004 non-fiction book by Fergus Henderson

The Whole Beast: Nose to Tail Eating
- Cover for The Whole Beast: Nose to Tail Eating
- Author: Fergus Henderson
- Language: English
- Subject: Pig
- Genre: Non-fiction
- Publisher: HarperCollins
- Publication date: 2004
- Publication place: England
- Media type: Hardback
- Pages: 224
- ISBN: 0-06-058536-6
- Followed by: Beyond Nose to Tail

The Whole Beast: Nose to Tail Eating is a 2004 book by Fergus Henderson that deals with how to cook every part of a pig, including parts rarely used in western cuisine, such as offal. It was originally released as Nose to Tail Eating: A Kind of British Cooking in England in 1999, but was updated and revamped to be more comprehensive for the American edition, which was also re-released in the UK. The updated release featured a foreword written by Anthony Bourdain, author of Kitchen Confidential.

The New Yorker has described the book as the "Ulysses of the whole Slow Food movement" because of its international readership. New York magazine considered it a "cult cookbook".

The Whole Beast was given the André Simon Award for gastronomic literature in 2000.

== Summary ==
The book features a number of recipes that, in total, utilize every part of the pig. In addition, it features a number of "techniques for brining, salting, pickling and preserving in fat", including explanations on how to "clear stock with egg whites and shells, how to bone out a trotter and how to bake bread using a tiny quantity of yeast for tastier results". It also includes descriptions on methods of "making stocks and the old-fashioned skill of rendering". The book also includes a few black and white photos that serve as decoration and example for the dishes and pieces of meat involved and discussed.

A famous quote from the book, and personal slogan of Henderson that is often cited by newspapers and used by master chefs reads, "If you're going to kill the animal it seems only polite to use the whole thing."

== Style ==
Amanda Hesser of the New York Times said that Henderson has "a lovely writing voice, as well, so the text, largely recipes, has a rare lyrical charm. An ingredient might be 'a large knob of butter' or 'a good supply of toast'". Kurt Timmermeister, author of Growing a Farmer: How I Learned to Live Off the Land, stated that the book "has a style [...] that I love: clean, crisp and confident with a touch of humor". Fay Maschler of the London Evening Standard explained that "Fergus the man comes across in the writing. You can almost see and hear his curvaceous smile, joyful semaphore and barks of 'Ah ha!'".

== Critical reception ==
Jonathan Reynolds of the New York Times praised Henderson's use of various, generally undesirable parts of the pig and pointed out that the book was "filled with sly observations and unpredictable advice about ingredients other than offal" as well. Also for the New York Times, Dwight Garner called the book a "terrifically dour, Edward Gorey-ish guide to cooking with offal: everything from pig's trotters and lamb's kidneys to brains, tripe, spleen, heart and tongue."

Elizabeth Johnson of The Journal News considered first editions of the book to be "collector's items" because of its popularity.

Lucy Waverman of The Globe and Mail said that its "dry humour and vivid imagery is a refreshing change from traditional recipe writing".

Aileen Reid of The Daily Telegraph called it a "surprisingly refined book" that is "beautifully and elegantly written".

Stephanie Alexander of The Age considered it to be an "absolute gem" and a "triumph of book design." Two years later for The Age, Necia Wilden wrote that the book was "a sleeper that went from underground classic to foodies' must-have".

== See also ==
- Charcuterie: The Craft of Salting, Smoking and Curing
- Bacon: A Love Story
- The Bacon Cookbook
- I Love Bacon!
- Seduced by Bacon
