= Charcuterie: The Craft of Salting, Smoking and Curing =

2005 book by Michael Ruhlman and Brian Polcyn

- Cover
- Author: Michael Ruhlman and Brian Polcyn
- Language: English
- Subject: Charcuterie
- Genre: Non-fiction
- Publisher: W. W. Norton
- Publication date: 2005
- Publication place: United States
- Media type: Hardback
- Pages: 320
- ISBN: 0-393-05829-8
- Preceded by: Bouchon
- Followed by: House: A Memoir

Charcuterie: The Craft of Salting, Smoking and Curing is a 2005 book by Michael Ruhlman and Brian Polcyn about using the process of charcuterie to cure various meats, including bacon, pastrami, and sausage. The book received extremely positive reviews from numerous food critics and newspapers, causing national attention to be brought to the method of charcuterie. Because of the high amount of interest, copies of the book sold out for a period of a few months at Amazon and Barnes & Noble.

== Summary ==
The book covers the various methods of charcuterie, including the "brining, dry-curing, pickling, hot- and cold-smoking, sausage-making, confit, and the construction of pâtés" that also involves more than 140 recipes for various dishes that have been made with the described methods.

== Critical reception ==
The book received critical acclaim. Mick Vann of the Austin Chronicle praised the use of "clear and concise instruction and revealing headnotes" and also said that the "realistic illustrations reinforce the text in an especially illuminating style, making it incredibly easy to follow the methods". Hilary Hylton of Time called it a "bible among foodie bloggers, eat-local enthusiasts and cooking professionals". Lorraine Eaton of The Virginian-Pilot said that the book "eloquently and patiently walks you through everything from bacon to Spanish chorizo." Alison Arnett of the Boston Globe described how it is a "detailed, even fussy, manual" and also how the author in an interview with her was surprised at the success of the book. Hsiao-Ching Chou of the Seattle Post-Intelligencer said that the book "makes an impassioned case for 'why we still love and need hand-preserved foods in the age of the refrigerator, the frozen dinner, Domino's Pizza, and the 24-hour grocery store.'" Chou also stated that the "intellectual cook will delight in reading and, perhaps, 'cooking' from this book." Adina Steiman of the New York Sun said to cooks in her review, "if you love good sausage, quality salami, and honest bacon, you'll find this fascinating reading even if you only make the simpler recipes". Scott Rowson of the Columbia Daily Tribune called it "approachable, yet exhaustively researched".

== See also ==
- The Whole Beast: Nose to Tail Eating
- Bacon: A Love Story
- The Bacon Cookbook
- I Love Bacon!
- Seduced by Bacon
