= Everything Tastes Better with Bacon =

2002 cookbook by Sara Perry

- Cover
- Author: Sara Perry
- Language: English
- Subject: Cooking
- Genre: Cookbook
- Published: May 1, 2002
- Publisher: Chronicle Books
- Publication place: United States
- Media type: Print (paperback)
- Pages: 132
- Awards: Included in The Best Recipes 2003-2004
- ISBN: 0-8118-3239-2
- OCLC: 47100742
- LC Class: 2001037240

Everything Tastes Better with Bacon: 70 Fabulous Recipes for Every Meal of the Day is a book about cooking with bacon written by author, food commentator and The Oregonian columnist Sara Perry. The book was published in the United States on May 1, 2002, by Chronicle Books, and in a French language edition in 2004 by Les Éditions de l'Homme in Montreal. In it, Perry describes her original concept of recipes combining sugar and bacon. Her book includes recipes for bacon-flavored dishes and desserts.

The book received mainly positive reviews and its recipes were selected for inclusion in The Best American Recipes 2003–2004. The St. Petersburg Times classed it as among the "most interesting and unique cookbooks" published, the Pittsburgh Post-Gazette highlighted it in the article "Favorite Cookbooks for 2002" and The Denver Post included it in a list of best cookbooks of 2002. A review in the Toronto Star criticized Perry's lack of creativity in her choice of recipes. Recipes from the work have been featured in related cookbooks.

== Background ==
Sara Perry is a resident of Portland, Oregon, and a columnist for The Oregonian, a radio restaurant commentator and a cookbook author. Before Everything Tastes Better with Bacon she wrote four books: The New Complete Coffee Book, The New Tea Book, Christmastime Treats and Weekends with the Kids. Her editor at Chronicle Books suggested bacon as a cookbook subject. Bacon's popularity and usage was increasing, but Perry believed that a paucity of recipes would make writing the book difficult. Recalling her fondness for honey-baked ham, she combined sugar and bacon to create dishes. Perry realized that bacon could be used to add seasoning in flavoring dishes, including salads and pastas. She observed that bacon increased the sweet and salty tastes of food. Everything Tastes Better with Bacon was published in English in paperback format by Chronicle Books on May 1, 2002. The book sold for a retail price of US$18.95 in its initial publication. A French paperback edition was published in 2004 by Les Editions de l'Homme, as part of its "Tout un plat!" ("What a dish!") series.

== Content summary ==
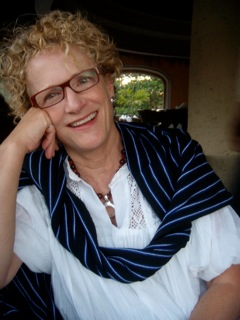
Sara Perry in 2009

Perry explains her feelings about bacon in the book's introduction, observing that its smell while cooking helps start her day and provide her with a sense of calmness. The beginning of the book provides background on the phrase "bringing home the bacon", introduces the reader to types of bacon and describes storage methods. The book offers 70 recipes for bacon-flavored dishes, in nine chapters organized by topic, including breakfast, leaf vegetables, pasta meals, side dishes, party servings, desserts and appetizers. Recipes include a bacon sandwich using other ingredients, a bacon crunch topping for ice cream, a bacon concoction to top a fruit crisp, and a pie crust that incorporates bacon. Methods are offered for cooking bacon on a stovetop, in an oven and under a griller to maximize its flavor and appearance. The book is illustrated with photographs by Sheri Giblin.

== Reception ==
Everything Tastes Better with Bacon was positively received by reviewers and food critics. The Chicago Tribune reported that it sold 30,000 copies in its first month. Janet F. Keeler of the St. Petersburg Times commented positively on the book's title. She noted the work was covered by food critics, who included its recipes in articles about the subject. Keeler interviewed Fran McCullough, author of The Best American Recipes 2003–2004, who posited that the Atkins diet (which emphasizes higher meat consumption as part of a low carbohydrate plan) had helped increase the popularity of bacon usage. She classed it among the "most interesting and unique cookbooks" published. Giblin's photography received favorable commentary from Cindy Hoedel of The Kansas City Star. Literary critic Dwight Garner of The New York Times included the book in a list of favorites among recent cooking publications. The review was critical of the author's dessert recipes, but agreed with her overall argument for increased use of bacon in cooking.

The Arizona Daily Star highlighted the book in their "Hot Reads" section. Assistant Texas Taste Editor for The Dallas Morning News Laura H. Ehret wrote that the book successfully conveys the experience of consuming bacon. Marty Meitus wrote for the Rocky Mountain News that the book had increased his appetite for bacon dishes. Meitus recommended dessert recipes, including Hazelnut-Bacon Candy Crunch, Peanut butter Cookies with Bacon Brittle, Pear-Apple Crisp with Brown Sugar-Bacon Topping and Ruby Raisin Mincemeat Tart. Steve Smith, executive chef at Dixon's Downtown Grill in Denver, was inspired by Perry's "Maple Sundae" recipe and used it to create his own macadamia-bacon crunch ice cream dessert.

Writing for the Pittsburgh Post-Gazette, Marlene Parrish gave the book a favorable review, highlighting it in her article "Favorite Cookbooks for 2002". She wrote that she enjoyed sampling the recipes from the book. Parrish added that Robert Atkins, creator of the Atkins diet, would think favorably of the "Gorgonzola Cheeseburgers with Bacon" dish. The Denver Post included the book in a list of best cookbooks of 2002. Another article for the same newspaper highlighted recipes in the book, including Spaghetti Alla Carbonara and Cobb salad, Pear-Apple Crisp with Brown Sugar-Bacon Topping and Bacon Brittle. A review in the Toronto Star criticized Perry's lack of creativity in her choice of recipes. The review concluded the book was a good deal compared to other cookbooks on the subject while noting its lack of comprehensiveness with the small number of total recipes included. Michele Anna Jordan of The Press Democrat recommended Perry's work, and commented that the author's zest for the subject was contagious.

== Impact ==
According to the Chicago Sun-Times and the St. Petersburg Times, Everything Tastes Better with Bacon is a niche work in the cookbook genre. Perry stated that bacon had undergone a renaissance period. The Christian Science Monitor noted in a 2003 article that bacon was becoming an increasingly used cooking ingredient, despite having been maligned by nutritionists. Two recipes from the book were selected for inclusion in The Best American Recipes 2003–2004: The Year's Top Picks from Books, Magazines, Newspapers and the Internet. Perry's recipe for "Succulent Bacon-Wrapped Shrimp" was referenced in the 2003 book Smoke & Spice: Cooking with Smoke, the Real Way to Barbecue. Fran McCullough, the author of The Best American Recipes, commented that the book was a surprising addition to the field.

The Atlantic said that three years after the book's publication, bacon had become as popular as chocolate or olive oil. Leah A. Zeldes observed in a 2006 article for the Chicago Sun-Times that the book contributed to the body of works that display the adaptability of bacon in recipes. In his 2009 book Hungry Monkey, author Matthew Amster-Burton commented on the phenomena involving bacon and books on the subject in prior years, listing the book along with The Bacon Cookbook and Seduced by Bacon. A 2013 article in the British newspaper The Independent cited the book as an example of increasing interest in pork.

== See also ==
- Bacon Explosion
- Bacon mania
- List of bacon dishes
- List of books about bacon
- National Pig Day

== Bibliography ==
- Aldana, Steven (2005). The Culprit and The Cure. Maple Mountain Press. p. 215. ISBN 0-9758828-0-5.
- Amster-Burton, Matthew (2009). Hungry Monkey: A Food-Loving Father's Quest to Raise an Adventurous Eater. Houghton Mifflin. p. 63. ISBN 978-0-15-101324-1.
- Bonwich, Joe (April 7, 2004). "The Whites of Spring – Egg Recipes by the Dozen". St. Louis Post-Dispatch. p. 1; Section: Let's Eat. Archived from the original on December 3, 2013 – via HighBeam Research.
- Browning-Blas, Kristen (December 1, 2002). "Italian cookbooks saucy stuff". The Denver Post. The Denver Post Corp. p. M–07 – via NewsBank.
- Browning-Blas, Kristen (February 26, 2003). "Aficionados tell why everybody loves bacon". The Denver Post. The Denver Post Corp. p. F–01 – via NewsBank.
- Burch, Cathalena E. (July 17, 2002). "In the mood for melons". The Arizona Daily Star. p. F1 – via NewsBank.
- Cichy, Betty (October 22, 2003). "A guide for bacon lovers". Bucks County Courier Times. Levittown, Pennsylvania. p. 4E – via NewsBank.
- Crooks, Laura (August 7, 2002). "Let bacon add a little sizzle to your meal". The Spokesman-Review. Cowles Publishing Company. p. D1. Archived from the original on September 6, 2002.
- Eddy, Kristin (May 15, 2002). "Back to bacon". Chicago Tribune. p. 1; Section: Good Eating. Archived from the original on December 5, 2013.
- English, Simon (October 11, 2002). "US shoppers bring home the bacon for investors". The Daily Telegraph. London, England. Archived from the original on November 29, 2013.
- Ehret, Laura H. (June 23, 2002). "Bacon basics". The Dallas Morning News. A. H. Belo Corporation. p. 6F – via NewsBank.
- Fabricant, Florence (June 19, 2002). "A Dutch Oven From France Turns a Home Into a Hearth". The New York Times. Archived from the original on November 29, 2013.
- Garner, Dwight (December 8, 2002). "Cooking". The New York Times Book Review. 107 (49): 54. Archived from the original on December 31, 2013.
- Hoedel, Cindy (July 31, 2002). "Mmmmm ... bacon". The Kansas City Star. The Kansas City Star Co. p. E2 – via NewsBank.
- Husted, Bill (December 13, 2002). "Fat Daddy serves up Starbucks". The Denver Post. The Denver Post Corp. p. FF–09 – via NewsBank.
- Jamison, Cheryl Alters; Jamison, Bill (2003). Smoke & Spice: Cooking with Smoke, the Real Way to Barbecue. Harvard Common Press. p. 340. ISBN 1-55832-262-0.
- Jordan, Michele Anna (May 1, 2002). "Smoking your own bacon offers flavorful reward". The Press Democrat. Santa Rosa, California. p. D1 – via NewsBank.
- Julian, Sheryl; Riven, Julie (July 28, 2002). "Bring home the bacon – Consumers are rediscovering the aromatic smoky pork that was once an American staple". The Boston Globe. Boston, Massachusetts: Globe Newspaper Company. p. 33; Section: Magazine. Archived from the original on June 10, 2014 – via HighBeam Research.
- Keeler, Janet K. (June 19, 2002). "Bacon with everything". St. Petersburg Times. Archived from the original on July 27, 2003.
- Keeler, Janet K. (October 29, 2003). "She clips, you cook". St. Petersburg Times. p. 1D. Archived from the original on November 19, 2003.
- Keeler, Janet K. (November 12, 2008). "A Bounty of Good Cookbooks; New offerings give cookbook lovers a reason to rejoice". St. Petersburg Times. p. 5E. Archived from the original on December 18, 2008.
- Kummer, Corby (November 2005). "Better Bacon: Artisan producers are making bacon even more irresistible". The Atlantic. The Atlantic Monthly Group. Archived from the original on May 12, 2008.
- Lawson, Kate (July 10, 2003). "Bacon's back in favor – Low-carb diets, adventurous cooks have more people living high on the hog". The Detroit News. MediaNews Group; Detroit Media Partnership. p. 12D – via NewsBank.
- Longino, Bob (September 19, 2002). "BLT and beyond; Experimenting with new and classic cuts, chefs and home cooks get back to bacon". Atlanta Journal-Constitution. p. Section: Living and Arts. Archived from the original on September 23, 2002.
- Mahoney, Louis (January 15, 2003). "Strip tease – Wake up and smell the bacon". Richmond Times-Dispatch. Richmond Newspapers, Inc. p. D–1. Archived from the original on February 3, 2003.
- McCarthy, Michael J. (October 10, 2002). "Bacon Leaves Frying Pan, Jumps Into $23 Entrees". The Wall Street Journal. Dow Jones and Company.
- McCullough, Fran; Stevens, Molly (2003). The Best American Recipes 2003–2004: The Year's Top Picks from Books, Magazines, Newspapers and the Internet. Houghton Mifflin Harcourt. pp. 84–85, 280, 284. ISBN 0-618-27384-0.
- Meitus, Marty (August 13, 2003a). "Cookbooks don't blow smoke in bringing home the bacon". Rocky Mountain News. E. W. Scripps Company, operated by Denver Newspaper Agency. p. 5D.
- Meitus, Marty (September 3, 2003b). "Slices of life – How to perk up the same-old sandwich routine". Rocky Mountain News. E. W. Scripps Company, operated by Denver Newspaper Agency. p. 3D.
- Muston, Samuel (March 22, 2013). "The best of British Bacon – Features What's the secret of a really tasty rasher, whether it's for a sandwich or to add some sizzle to your stew? Samuel Muston joins the experts in a competition to pick Britain's finest". The Independent. London. pp. 44–45, Section: Features, Edition: 1st. Archived from the original on March 29, 2013.
- Parrish, Marlene (December 19, 2002). "Favorite Cookbooks for 2002". Pittsburgh Post-Gazette. Block Communications. p. F–1; Section: Food. Archived from the original on December 21, 2002.
- Paulson, Amanda (June 11, 2003). "Bacon keeps on sizzling: Despite a bad rap from nutritionists, bacon is enjoying a renaissance among chefs, home cooks". The Christian Science Monitor. p. 16. Archived from the original on December 10, 2003.
- Perry, Sara (2002). Everything Tastes Better with Bacon. Chronicle Books. ISBN 0-8118-3239-2.
- Perry, Sara; Caruso, Maren (2003). The New Complete Coffee Book. Chronicle Books. p. 121. ISBN 0-8118-4021-2.
- "Back into the frying pan – Bacon is hot again – and look at all the sizzling varieties". The Sacramento Bee. The McClatchy Company. September 18, 2002. p. F1.
- Perry, Sara (2004). Bacon, Tout un plat! (in French). Les Editions de l'Homme. ISBN 978-2-7619-1953-1.
- Saunders, Lucy (August 7, 2002). "Book serves up a huge slab of bacon ideas". The Seattle Times. p. C4. Archived from the original on November 29, 2013.
- Smith, Kathie (August 20, 2002). "Tasty and trendy, bacon is back". The Blade. Toledo, Ohio: Block Communications. p. D1. Archived from the original on September 1, 2002.
- "There's no mistakin', it's bacon". Toronto Star. Toronto Star Newspapers Limited. June 5, 2002. p. D05 – via NewsBank.
- WorldCat (2011a). "Everything Tastes Better with Bacon". Online Computer Library Center. WorldCat. OCLC 47100742.
- WorldCat (2011b). "Bacon, Tout un plat!". Online Computer Library Center. WorldCat. OCLC 54460685.
- Zeldes, Leah A. (October 4, 2006). "Bacon from A to Z: Getting to know everything about bacon". Chicago Sun-Times. p. S1 / Front. Archived from the original on October 30, 2006.
