= I Love Bacon! =

Cookbook by Ben Fink

- Book cover
- Author: Jayne Rockmill
- Illustrator: Ben Fink
- Cover artist: Ben Fink
- Language: English
- Subject: Bacon
- Genre: Cookbook
- Publisher: Andrews McMeel Publishing
- Publication date: October 2010
- Publication place: United States
- Media type: Hardback
- Pages: 144
- ISBN: 978-0-7407-9766-8
- LC Class: 2010927149

I Love Bacon! is a cookbook with over fifty recipes devoted to bacon and bacon dishes, many of them from celebrity chefs. The book was written by Jayne Rockmill and photography was provided by Ben Fink. Broken down into eight sections, the book covered how to make homemade bacon and moves onto "brunch" and "small bites" before covering soups, salads and sides, pasta, fish, meat, and desserts. I Love Bacon! was published in October 2010 by Andrews McMeel Publishing and met with favorable reviews for its unique dishes and helpful culinary tips for novices.

== Background ==
The book's author, Jayne Rockmill, is a literary agent based in New York City whose clients include Tony Caputo, François Halard, and the professional photographer and storm chaser, Jim Reed. Rockmill had also become involved in producing charity food and wine events, and is a longtime supporter of the New York City Food Bank and Share Our Strength, which focuses on ending childhood hunger. She conceived the book as a way to help raise money for their work, and a portion of the proceeds from I Love Bacon will be donated to the two charities. Rockmill began by asking chefs she knew personally to donate bacon recipes, and then contacted others across the United States. In some cases, she adapted the original recipes in collaboration with the chefs.

The book's illustrator is the well-known food photographer, Ben Fink, whose photographs appear in Food & Wine, Bon Appétit, Saveur and publications of the Culinary Institute of America. A native of Memphis, Tennessee now based in New York, Fink illustrated Jacques Pépin's, Fast Food My Way (2004) and Maggie Glezer's Artisan Baking Across America (2000) for which he won a James Beard Foundation Award in 2001. Some of Fink's more unusual food photographs are those for Martha Hopkins and Randall Lockridge's 1997 InterCourses: An Aphrodisiac Cookbook, where the food is photographed against the background of a naked human body.

== Contents ==
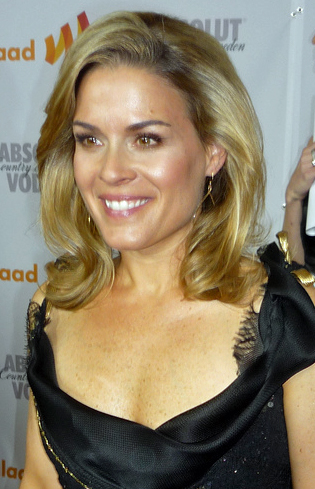
Chef Cat Cora who contributed the recipe for "Pig Candy Ice Cream" to I Love Bacon!

I Love Bacon! contains over 50 recipes from celebrity chefs including Cat Cora, John Besh, Ming Tsai, and Chris Cosentino, as well as brief biographies of the chefs themselves. It presents basic bacon recipes as well as dishes with bacon as one of the chief ingredients. The recipes are grouped into eight sections beginning with Make Your Own Bacon which has recipes for "Classic Cured Bacon", "Spicy Braised Bacon", "Soy-Ginger Braised Bacon", "Crispy Pork Belly", and "Chinese Style Pork Belly". The remaining seven sections (Brunch; Small Bites; Soups, Salads and Sides, Pasta, Fish, Meat and Desserts) contain recipes for dishes using bacon as one of the main ingredients.

The Brunch section begins with a recipe from Seattle-based Black Rock Spirits for "Bakon Bloody Mary", a variant on the traditional Bloody Mary cocktail using bacon infused vodka with the glass rim dipped in lime juice and finely crumbled grilled bacon. Although the majority of recipes in this section feature bacon with its traditional brunch partner, eggs, there is also a recipe for "Mediterranean BLTs". This version of the classic BLT sandwich pairs the bacon, lettuce and tomato with toasted focaccia bread and red-pepper aioli in place of mayonnaise. Another version of the BLT using toasted brioche and sun-dried tomatoes cut into mini-sandwiches appears in the Small Bites section which is devoted to bacon-based hors d'oeuvres.

Among the recipes in Soups, Salads and Sides are "Egg Chowder with Bacon and New Potatoes", "Grilled Bacon and Cucumber Salad with Chili Caramel Dressing", and "Spicy Braised Bacon with Spagna Beans and Treviso Radicchio" which uses thickly sliced pork belly bacon. (Note: Spagna beans are a variety of white bean commonly used in Italian cooking where they are known as fagioli bianchi di Spagna.) The Pasta section has a recipe for "Bacon Mac and Cheese" from Julie Taras Wallach, the chef and co-owner of the Tipsy Parson and Little Giant restaurants in New York City. Her variant on the traditional macaroni and cheese uses cavatelli pasta seasoned with dijon mustard, thyme, rosemary, garlic, and nutmeg and incorporates sauteed onion and pieces of grilled bacon. One of the recipes in the Meat section, "Veal and Foie Gras Meatloaf Wrapped in Bacon", comes from Mark Allen, who in 1997 became the youngest chef, and the first American, to have headed The Dining Room at the Ritz-Carlton in Boston. Allen also contributed a recipe for the Fish section, "Whole Roasted Branzino with Carrots and Bacon". Other dishes in that section include "Pancetta-Wrapped Monkfish with Cauliflower Flan" and "Bluefish with Corn, Avocado, and Bacon Salad".

Like its somewhat lengthier predecessors, Sara Perry's Everything Tastes Better with Bacon (2002), Pruess and Lape's Seduced by Bacon (2006), and James Villas's The Bacon Cookbook (2007), Rockmill's I Love Bacon! includes sweet dishes using bacon. Among the recipes in the Desserts section are "Bacon Panna Cotta with Huckleberries", "Cane Sugar and Bacon-Iced Cupcakes", and Cat Cora's "Pig Candy Ice Cream". Cora's recipe uses a pound (.454 kilograms) of chopped applewood-smoked bacon per quart (.946 litres) of brown sugar-sweetened vanilla ice cream.

== Reception ==
Carol Johnson writing in the Kansas City Star described I Love Bacon! as both a cookbook with "inventive" recipes and "a mini-course in some of the country's top restaurants." Johnson noted that not all recipes were for beginners, but found the accompanying notes for many of the recipes with information about techniques and ingredients to be helpful. She described Ben Fink's photography as "vivid and mouth-watering, if a little spare." The Republic of Bacon website favorably reviewed the cookbook for its ability to go beyond the standard classic cured bacon dishes and the added biographies of the leading industry chefs which contributed recipes to the book.

== See also ==
- List of books about bacon
- List of bacon dishes
