= Lape =

Lape is a surname. Notable people with the surname include:

- Antanas Lapė (1961–2007), Lithuanian Catholic priest
- Bob Lape (born 1933), American author
- Dave Lape (1947–2022), American racing driver, fabricator, and promoter
- Esther Lape (1881–1981), American journalist and publicist
- Lizzie Lape (1853–1917), American brothel owner
