= Blue Ribbon Bacon Festival =

Celebration of bacon in Iowa, United States

Coordinates: 41°35′13.75″N 93°37′18.08″W

- Genre: Bacon
- Date: Saturday
- Begins: 10am
- Ends: 4pm
- Frequency: Annual
- Location: Des Moines, Iowa
- Website: www.blueribbonbaconfestival.com

The Blue Ribbon Bacon Festival is an annual festival in Des Moines, Iowa. Founded by members of the Iowa Bacon Board, the festival sold 200 tickets to the first festival in 2008. Today, the bacon celebration has grown to host approximately 14,000 bacon-lovers in all. Ticket holders can compete in a bacon-eating contest, listen to lectures about bacon, and sample bacon from vendors. Festival organizers have extended the celebration internationally through the Blue Ribbon Bacon Tour. These are not to be confused with the Baconfest that takes place on Thanksgiving throughout the Midwest.

== Description ==
For the price of an admission ticket, each attendee has been entitled to a T-shirt, a choice of bacon samples, and a koozie (an insulation-wrapping for a canned beverage, like beer or soda pop). The Festival also has featured lectures about bacon, a bacon-eating contest, and live performances by entertainers.

In 2012, a major change was made from the "all you can eat" bacon, which was included in the ticket price from years earlier, to a pay as you eat price structure. Justification for the added cost was to reduce lines for bacon goods vendors bring in and cook. Vendor Bacon items run $3 to $8 a piece on top of the ticket price.

== History ==
The Blue Ribbon Bacon Festival was founded in 2008 by Brooks Reynolds, an Iowa realtor, on National Pig Day, 1 March 2008.

The Festival attracted 200 people in 2008 and 300 in 2009. The 2010 Festival sold all 600 tickets in 30 minutes: That year, the Festival served roughly 30 thousand bacon-strips (that is, about 50 strips per person); the bacon's total weight was 1,200 pounds (540 kg), that is, 2 pounds (0.91 kg) per person. The next year, in 2011, the Festival sold all 1,500 tickets in 4 minutes.

== Themes ==
Year	Theme
2008	Blue Ribbon Bacon Festival
2009	2nd Annual Blue Ribbon Bacon Festival
2010	2010 - A Bacon Odyssey
2011	Field of Bacon: If You Fry It, They Will Come!
2012	Baconpocolypse: I Love the Smell of Bacon in the Morning
2013	Viking Bacon Quest: A Journey to the Land of Fire and Ice....and Bacon!
2014	Viva Las Bacon!
2015	Baconmania VIII!
2016	Body By Bacon!
2017	Blue Ribbon Bacon Festival X - The Good, The Bad, and The Bacon!
2020	Baconritaville

== State of Bacon film ==
In 2013, the Iowa Bacon Board in conjunction with Digital Cuvée, a production company founded by Jason Cook, set out to make a film entitled State of Bacon utilizing the festival as the centerpiece of the story. In the style of Christopher Guest or Sasha Cohen, the film is a mockumentary, utilizing actors to interact in the real world, as a mash-up style to tell each storyline, and overall transport viewers to the wild and crazy world of Bacon Wonderland.

== Tour ==
After having worked at the Festival, some of its entertainers formed the Blue Ribbon Bacon Tour. One of the Tour's regular participants, Heather Lauer, appeared on the 2009 Tour's stop in Pittsburgh; there, for thirty dollars, participants could compete in a bacon-eating contest and (without additional cost) taste bacon-samples from vendors. Before joining this Tour, Lauer had written the book, Bacon: A love story.
