= List of Icelandic films of 2014 =

The Icelandic film industry produced over twenty feature films in 2014. This article fully lists all non-pornographic films, including short films, that had a release date in that year and which were at least partly made by Iceland. It does not include films first released in previous years that had release dates in 2014.
Also included is an overview of the major events in Icelandic film, including film festivals and awards ceremonies, as well as lists of those films that have been particularly well received, both critically and financially.

== Major releases ==
| Opening | | Title | Cast and Crew | Studio | Genre(s) | Ref. |
|---|---|---|---|---|---|---|
| J A N U A R Y | 19 | Dead Snow: Red vs. Dead | Director: Tommy Wirkola; Cast: Vegar Hoel, Orjan Gamst, Martin Starr, Ingrid Haas, Jocelyn DeBoer, Stig Frode Henriksen, Kristoffer Joner | Well Go USA Entertainment (US) | Horror; Comedy | |
| J A N U A R Y | 19 | Land Ho! | Directors: Martha Stephens, Aaron Katz; Cast: Paul Eenhoorn, Earl Lynn Nelson, Karrie Crouse, Elizabeth McKee, Alice Olivia Clarke, Emmsjé Gauti | Sony Pictures Classics | Adventure; Comedy | |
| M A Y | 16 | Life in a Fishbowl | Director: Baldvin Zophoníasson; Cast: Hera Hilmar | | Drama | |
| M A Y | 16 | State of Bacon | Director: Jason Cook; Cast: David Anthony Higgins, Jim Duggan, Chuck Grassley, Terry Branstad | | Comedy | |

== Minor releases ==
| Title | Director | Release date | Genre |
|---|---|---|---|
| Afinn (The Grandad) | Bjarni Thorsson | 25 September 2014 (Iceland) | Comedy |
| Áhugamál Íslendinga | Birgitta Sigursteinsdóttir | 20 September 2014 (Iceland) | Documentary |
| Biðin: The Wait | Thoromar Jonsson | 3 June 2014 (Iceland) | Documentary |
| Birds | Ulu Braun | 7 February 2014 (Germany) | Documentary |
| Brave Men's Blood | Olaf de Fleur Johannesson | 17 October 2014 (Iceland) | Action |
| Brave Men's Blood | Olaf de Fleur Johannesson | | Action |
| Brütål Mürk | Bjarni Gautur | | Action |
| Decode Me! | Kristján Þór Kristjánsson | | Documentary |
| Eldur Á Himni | Boris Schaarschmidt | 7 December 2014 (France) | Documentary |
| End of Summer | Jóhann Jóhannsson | November 2014 (Denmark) | Documentary |
| Fjallabræður | Eyþór Jóvinsson | 9 June 2014 (Iceland) | Documentary |
| Grafir & Bein | Anton Sigurdsson | 31 October 2014 (Iceland) | Drama |
| Harry Og Heimir | Bragi Thor Hinriksson | 16 April 2014 (Iceland) | Comedy |
| Heild | Petur Kristjan Gudmundsson | 4 April 2014 (Iceland) | Documentary |
| Hjörleifur | Stephen Hunt | | Documentary |
| Impact | Agusta Einarsdottir | 28 December 2014 (Iceland) | Documentary |
| Infrastructures | Aurèle Ferrier | | Documentary |
| L for Leisure | Whitney Horn | 20 March 2015 (USA) | Comedy |
| Les bones persones | Jaume Benedito | 3 December 2014 (Andorra) | Comedy |
| Ndege Ndogo Little Bird | Mathieu Mazza | July 2014 (USA) | Documentary |
| Oilfields Mines Hurricanes | Fabian Altenried | January 2014 (Netherlands) | Drama |
| Paris of the North | Hafsteinn Gunnar Sigurðsson | 2014 (Iceland) | Comedy |
| Powerwalk | Wolfgang Aichner | | Documentary |
| Reykjavik Rising | Danny Mitchell | | Documentary |
| Salome | Yrsa Roca Fannberg | June 2014 (Iceland) | Documentary |
| Så meget godt i vente | Phie Ambo | January 2015 (Finland) | Documentary |
| Song | Selma Vilhunen | 11 April 2014 (Finland) | Documentary |
| SS Hangover | Ragnar Kjartansson | 6 March 2014 (USA) | Musical |
| Tenebrae Lux | Ryan Boran | | Science Fiction |
| The Biggest Rescue | Bragi Thor Hinriksson | 30 October 2014 (Iceland) | Action |
| The Dickumentary | Sofian Khan | 31 March 2015 (USA) | Documentary |
| The Island and the Whale | Katy Haas | | Documentary |
| The More You Know. The More You Know. | Karna Sigurdardottir | | Documentary |
| There Is No Real Way of Knowing | Julia Weissenberg | 4 April 2014 (UK) | Documentary |
| Time and Time and Again | Markús Þór Andrésson | 13 November 2014 (Denmark) | Documentary |
| Trend Beacons | Örn Marino Arnarson | November 2014 (Denmark) | Documentary |
| Tributaries Fly-Fishing Film | R.C. Cone | January 2014 (USA) | Documentary |
| Valsmaður fram í rauðan dauðann | Hallur Örn Árnason | 8 June 2014 (Iceland) | Documentary |
| Vanishing World of the Sea Gypsies | Johann Sigfusson | | Documentary |
| Vikingo | Þorfinnur Guðnason | 27 November 2014 (Iceland) | Documentary |
| Við erum til | Helga Margrét Guðmundsdóttir | 31 October 2014 (Iceland) | Documentary |
| Vive La France | Helgi Felixson | 31 August 2014 (Sweden) | Documentary |
| Volcanic Planet | Peter Rowe | 4 January 2014 (Canada) | Documentary |
| Zombie Island | Marteinn Ibsen | 14 April 2014 (Iceland) | Horror |

== See also ==
- 2014 in film
- 2014 in Iceland
- Cinema of Iceland
- List of Icelandic submissions for the Academy Award for Best Foreign Language Film
