= List of books about bacon =

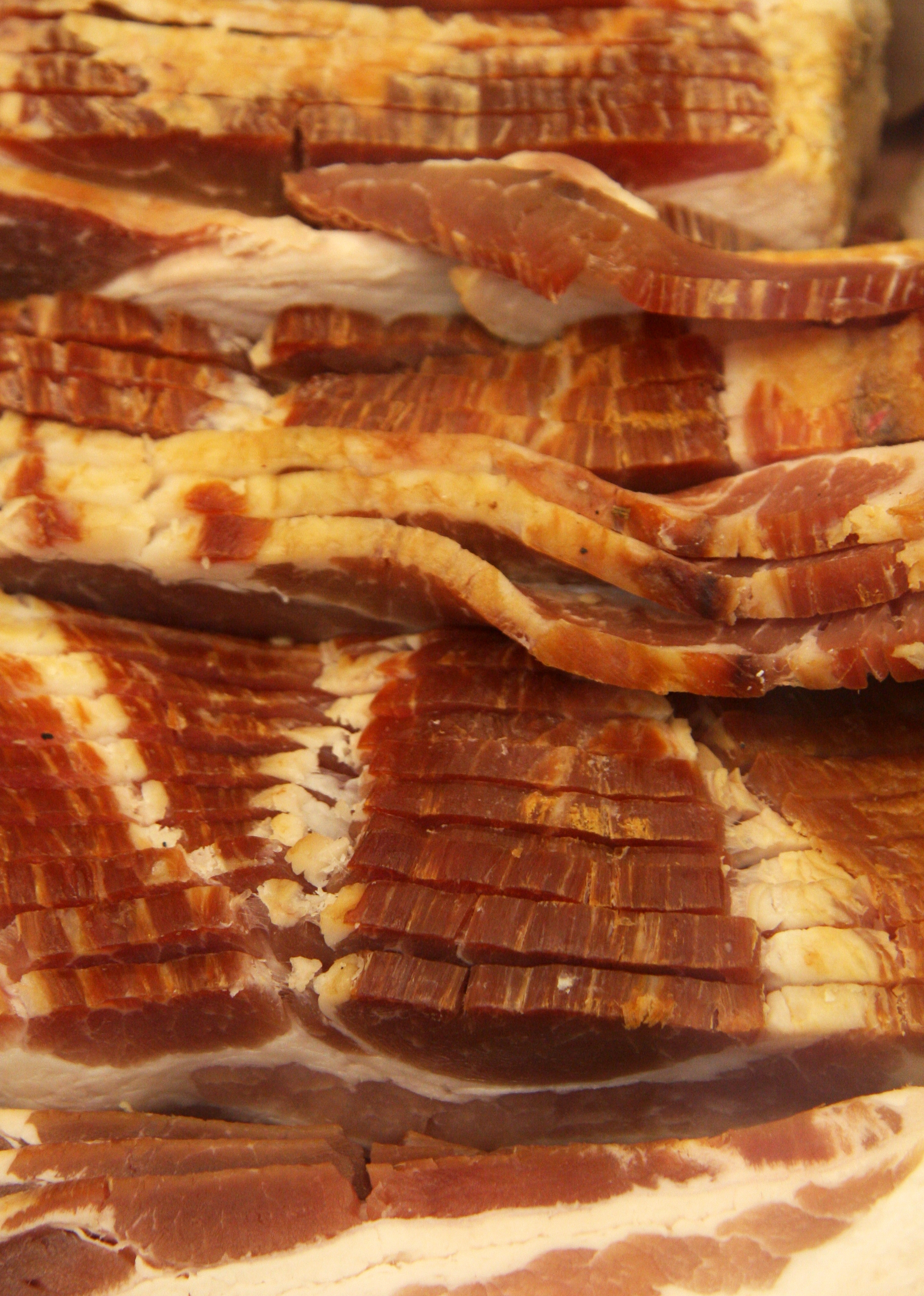
Bacon strips

This is a bibliography of works about bacon, including cookbooks and history books.

- Seduced by Bacon
- Everything Tastes Better with Bacon
- Bacon and Hams
- Bacon: A Love Story
- Snake 'n' Bacon
- The Bacon Cookbook
- The BLT Cookbook
- I Love Bacon!

== See also ==
- Bacon mania
- List of bacon dishes
