= Lizzie Lape =

American brothel owner

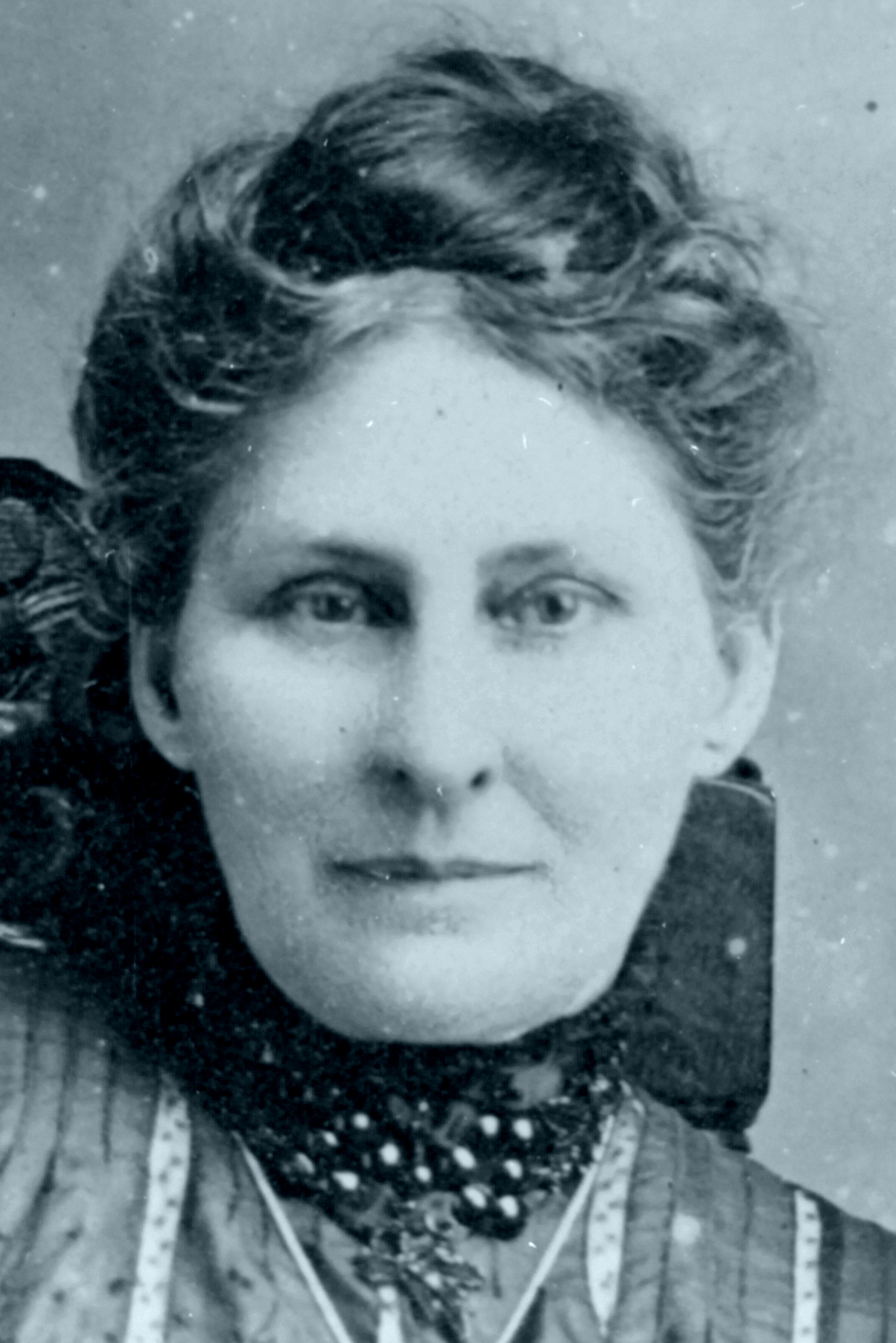
Portrait of Lizzie, taken in Shelby, Ohio, circa 1903, Burt Mossholder Studio

Lizzie Lape (August 15, 1853 – sometime after Thanksgiving 1917) was an American madam who owned and operated multiple bordellos in Ohio at the end of the 19th century and early into the 20th.

== Biography ==
Lizzie Lape was born Amy Elizabeth Rogers in Whitley County, Kentucky before the Civil War. She was the daughter of Prior and Cynthia (Whitman) Rogers of Williamsburg, Kentucky and granddaughter of a Revolutionary War veteran named James Rogers of Laurel and Whitley Counties, Kentucky.

In the late 1970s, family oral history revealed these details to Lizzie's descendants: she came from the South, was a lady of the evening, had a business in Chicago, and became a madam who ran a house of ill repute in Stow, Ohio.

A great-great-granddaughter, Debra Lape, discovered much more of Lizzie's purposely obscured story over the next forty years, publishing a book in 2014 titled, Looking For Lizzie – The True Story of an Ohio Madam, Her Sporting Life and Hidden Legacy.

== U.S. Presidential and literary links ==
Lizzie Rogers married eight times, to Jeremiah Lape, George Huffman, Jack Larzelere, Harry DeWitt (son), Jack DeWitt (father), Charles Veon, James Shetler, and John France.

She owned and/or operated brothels and saloons in Dayton, Lima, Marion, Akron, Stow, and Shelby covering five counties, some simultaneously, including the "White Pigeon" of both Marion and Shelby, Ohio.

Local newspapers such as the Akron Beacon Journal and the Marion Daily Star capitalized on the sensational and disreputable nature of her businesses, both public and private. One account involves the Marion Daily Star's young editor Warren G. Harding and a hoax staged by him upon a competing newspaper editor at Lizzie's White Pigeon.

Madam Lizzie and her second White Pigeon bordello in Shelby may have helped set a part of the stage for Ohio author Dawn Powell in her thinly veiled Shelby-centric novel, Dance Night.

== Antebellum madams ==
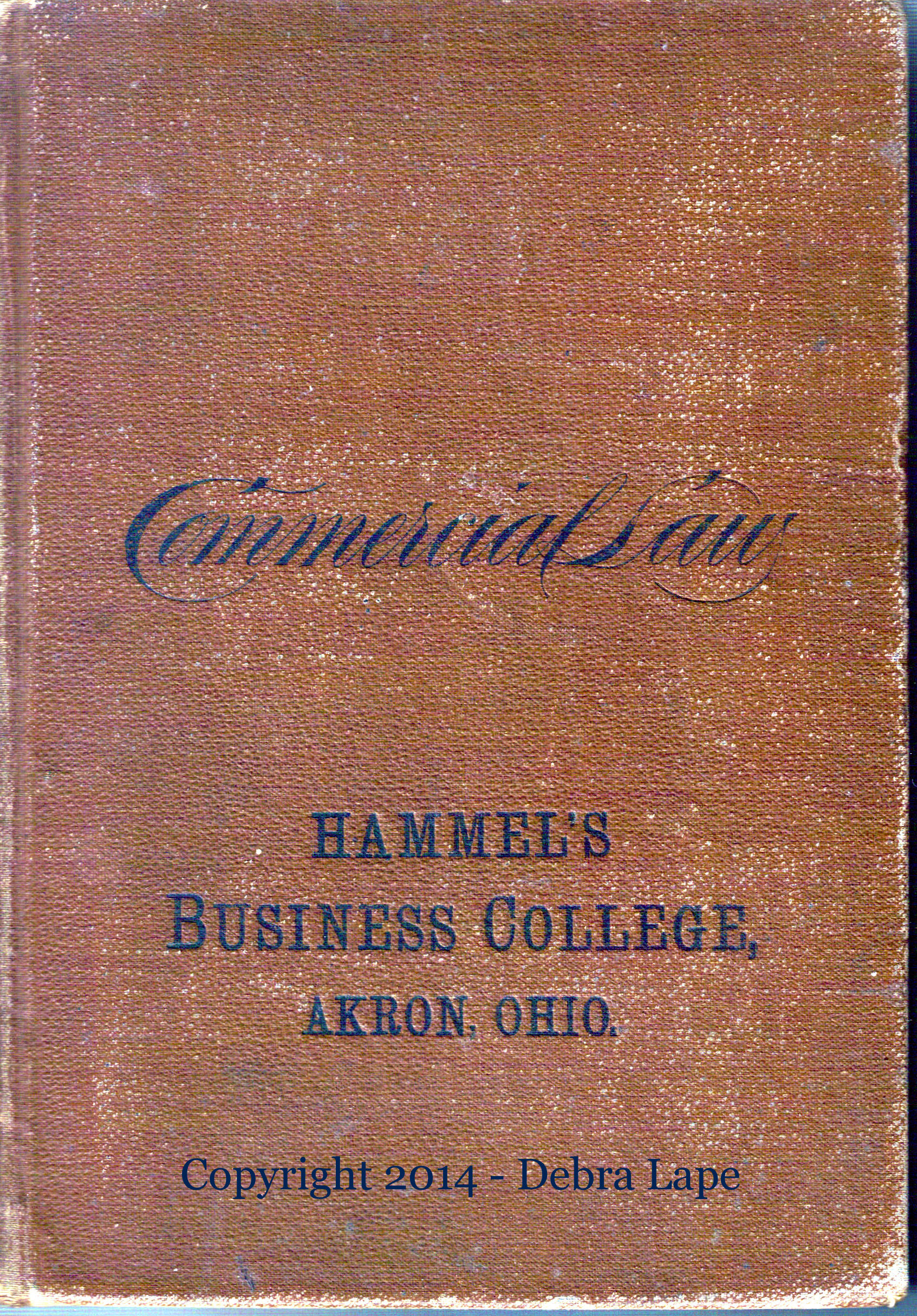
Lizzie's son Arville Lape's Commercial Law textbook while he attended Hammel's Business College in Akron on March 30, 1896

Lape had something in common with several other enterprising madams of her generation, that is, she was raised in Kentucky prior to the Civil War. Belle Brezing, the celebrated madam of Lexington, Kentucky upon whom it is believed author Margaret Mitchell based her fictional madam Belle Watling in Gone With The Wind is another. Two other highly successful Chicago-based madams sisters, Minna and Ada Simms aka the Everleigh Sisters of the Everleigh Club, were born in Charlottesville, Kentucky. Whether any of these Kentuckians knew or inspired each other is not known.

== Lizzie and the law ==
As obscure as she would become, Lape set an early precedent in the U.S. court system in behalf of entrepreneurial women. She was sued in Akron, Ohio for child support, a rarity at the time. Her son's trust included the White Pigeon property and proceeds and his trustee was the ex-Mayor of Akron, Lorenzo Dow Watters Later, she would hire him as her own attorney.

Lizzie Lape was the first brothel owner in Marion County, Ohio to be sued by the State of Ohio as a test of the new Winn Law which targeted liquor sales in houses of ill repute. With an aggressive legal defense, she won this and many other court cases. Lape owned and directed the operations of her White Pigeon of Marion, Ohio for a full 20 years. Through her many divorces, she was sued by husbands who wanted to take ownership of the property she was accumulating, testing again and again the recently enacted Married Women's Property Act.

Lape's trail ran cold when she made a publicity-laden religious conversion in two city newspapers. Her business retirement made it much harder for anyone to discover the rest of her story.

== Legacy ==
Due to the publication of her biography, Lizzie is now being recognized as she would never have been in life by genealogy groups and libraries in the Ohio cities and towns where she once lived and ran bawdy houses and saloons. Post Civil War Ohio was her historical home. In March 2014, actress Mary Kathleen Tripp portrayed Madam Lizzie for the first time, in a local history event called "Night at Heritage Hall" in Marion, Ohio, sponsored annually by the Marion County Historical Society.

The forty-year genealogical unearthing of Lizzie Lape's story is one that resonates with many who have embraced the search for family history, "black sheep" notwithstanding. Television shows such as the PBS-sponsored Henry Louis Gates, Jr.'s Finding Your Roots and the successful series Who Do You Think You Are? fuel a new generation of seekers, long after Alex Haley's acclaimed book and movie series Roots galvanized a nation of family tree research.

== Descendants ==
One of Lizzie Lape's descendants and the author's father is American broadcast journalist Bob Lape. Debra Lape's step-mother and author, Joanna Pruess, encouraged and inspired the writer.
