= Todd Heisler =

American photojournalist

- Born: 1972 (age 53–54)
- Occupations: Photojournalist and Pulitzer prize winner

Todd Heisler (born 1972) is an American photojournalist and Pulitzer prize winner. He is a staff photographer for The New York Times. In September 2010, he won an Emmy as a member of the New York Times "One in 8 Million" team.

Born in Chicago, Heisler is a 1994 graduate of Illinois State University. While at the Rocky Mountain News, Heisler was awarded the 2006 Pulitzer Prize for Feature Photography for "Final Salute," a series of photographs, taken over the course of a year, profiling the funerals of Marines who died in the war and the work of then Major Steve Beck, who is responsible for notifying the family members of the Marine's death. The award citation referred to Heisler's work as a "haunting, behind-the-scenes look" at the funerals. Heisler won the prize the same year as fellow Rocky Mountain News reporter Jim Sheeler, who won a 2006 Pulitzer Prize for Feature Writing, covered Major Beck, the Marine Honor Guard, and the families for nearly a year. Images from "Final Salute" project were published by Time, Paris Match, Stern, the Sunday Times, Communication Arts, and other publications in addition to the Rocky Mountain News.

Images from "Final Salute" also won first prize in the "People in the News" category at the World Press Photo awards, first place in newspaper feature photography for the National Headliner Awards and the American Society of Newspaper Editors Award for the "Community Service Photojournalism" category. Heisler also has won honors from Visa Pour L'Image, and first prize in the National Press Photographers Association's Best of Photojournalism award for best published picture story in a publication over 115,000 circulation, as well as both first and second place in general news reporting in a newspaper from Pictures of the Year International, the Lead Award for "Photo of the Year," and first prize for "People in the News" of the China International Press Photo Contest. Heisler also judged for the 2006 Atlanta Photojournalism Seminar.

Heisler was also a member of the Rocky Mountain News team that won the 2003 Pulitzer Prize for its coverage of wildfire season in Colorado.
