= Jim Sheeler =

American journalist

Jim Sheeler (1968–2021) was an American journalist known for his writing of obituaries. He was a features writer for the Rocky Mountain News and the Denver Post in Denver, Colorado where he was known for his feature-length obituaries featuring the lives of every-day Coloradans and servicemembers killed in the Iraq War. His 2006 feature for The Rocky Mountain News entitled Final Salute followed US Marine Corps Major Steve Beck, a casualty notification officer, as he informed familymembers of veterans that their loved ones had been killed in war. Final Salute was awarded a Pulitzer Prize for Feature Writing. Rocky Mountain News photojournalist Todd Heisler worked with Sheeler and was also awarded a Pulitzer Prize for feature photography for the work.

Sheeler expanded upon the material in Final Salute to write the 2008 book Final Salute: A Story of Unfinished Lives. In the book, Sheeler shadowed Major Beck for 1 year in his casuality notification duties. Sheeler further expounded on Beck's duties which included coordinating funeral services and providing emotional support for the families. The book also documents the lives and grieving process of the servicemembers' loved ones. The book was a finalist for the 2008 National Book Award for Nonfiction. The judging panel stated: "The book's sincerity and simplicity are integral to its strength." Writing for The New York Times, in a negative review, Isaac Chotiner criticized the book stating: "The problem with 'Final Salute' is that it reads like a series of newspaper articles strung together somewhat incoherently." Chotiner also stated that the different families' grieving process and emotions in the days and weeks after a death notification were very similar, making it difficult to distinguish between different family members. Also writing for The New York Times, Janet Maslin commended Sheeler for his empathetic reporting of the family members' grieving. With Maslin stating that veterans' family members grief and loss were an underreported aspect of the Iraq War. Maslin praised the depiction of Major Beck, stating: "Major Beck’s utter dedication to his job is one thing that gives “Final Salute” its strong backbone."

Sheeler also wrote the 2005 book Life on the Death Beat: A Handbook for Obituary Writers, which was a guide for obituary writers. In 2007 Sheeler wrote the book Obit: Inspiring Stories of Ordinary People Who Led Extraordinary Lives, which was a collection of feature-length obituaries that Sheeler had written of ordinary, everday people.

Sheeler was a professor of journalism at Case Western Reserve University in Cleveland, Ohio where he was known for his mentorship of students. He received the Carl F. Wittke Award for excellence in undergraduate teaching from the university. He received a degree in journalism from Colorado State University and a master's degree from the University of Colorado in 2007. In the 1990s he wrote for the newspapers the Daily Camera and the Boulder Planet, both in Boulder Colorado.
