= The Wrong Guy =

- DVD cover
- Directed by: David Steinberg
- Written by: Dave Foley; David Anthony Higgins; Jay Kogen
- Produced by: Jon Slan; Janet E. Cuddy; Martin Walters
- Starring: Dave Foley; David Higgins; Jennifer Tilly; Joe Flaherty; Colm Feore
- Cinematography: David A. Makin
- Edited by: Christopher Cooper
- Music by: Lawrence Shragge
- Production companies: Handmade Films; Paragon Entertainment Corporation
- Distributed by: Lions Gate Films
- Release date: August 1, 1997
- Running time: 92 minutes
- Country: Canada
- Language: English

The Wrong Guy is a 1997 Canadian black comedy film directed by David Steinberg, and starring Dave Foley, along with David Anthony Higgins, Jennifer Tilly, Colm Feore and Joe Flaherty. It was written by Foley, Higgins and Jay Kogen.

The script was inspired by a sketch Foley wrote during his days with The Kids in the Hall.

== Synopsis ==
Dorky executive Nelson Hibbert gets passed over for a promotion after spending years angling for the job, including engagement to one of his boss's daughters. He reacts angrily, swearing to kill the boss as security drags him away. When he later discovers his boss – already murdered – he assumes that he will be blamed. He flees, unaware that security cameras have already identified the true killer.

Chaotic events transpire and what follows is a bizarre series of misadventures marked with slapstick routines and constant one-liners. Nelson tries to escape to Mexico, but along the way he frequently encounters both the real killer and the police, causing the killer to mistake him for a government agent and make frequent attacks on his life. Nelson meets a narcoleptic farm girl named Lynn and falls in love with her, only for them both to end up as the killer's hostages. It turns out that Ken Daly, who got the promotion, had the company president killed in order to gain the spot quickly. Detective Arlen finally catches up with the killer and hostages, having halfheartedly pursued them while using the investigation as an excuse to spend police money on fancy dinners and broadway shows. The police capture the killer and Hibbert resolves to marry Lynn, having realized he must leave the rat race and live a simpler life, but he is instantly convinced by Lynn to return to Cleveland with her instead.

== Cast ==
- Dave Foley as Nelson Hibbert
- David Higgins as Detective Arlen
- Jennifer Tilly as Lynn Holden
- Joe Flaherty as Fred Holden
- Colm Feore as The Killer
- Dan Redican as Ken Daly
- Alan Scarfe as Farmer Brown
- Kenneth Welsh as Mr. Nagel
- Enrico Colantoni as Creepy Guy
- Richard Chevolleau as Jimmy
- Kevin McDonald as Motel Manager
- Jay Kogen as Bus Driver
- David Steinberg as Outpatient in Neck Brace

The members of Barenaked Ladies made cameos as singing policemen.

== Response ==
=== Awards ===
- Film Discovery Jury Award (U.S. Comedy Arts Festival) - Best Screenplay Dave Foley, David Anthony Higgins, Jay Kogen

=== Critical reception ===
The film holds an 84% "Fresh" rating on the review aggregator Rotten Tomatoes, based on 5000+ audience reviews.

In 2023, Barry Hertz of The Globe and Mail named the film as one of the 23 best Canadian comedy films ever made.
