= State of Bacon =

- Official theatrical release poster
- Directed by: Jason Cook
- Written by: Jason Cook
- Produced by: Jason Cook; Marshall Porter
- Starring: David Anthony Higgins; "Hacksaw Jim" Duggan; Senator Chuck Grassley; Governor Terry Branstad
- Edited by: Jason Cook
- Music by: Jeff Babko
- Release date: May 16, 2014 (United States)
- Countries: United States, Iceland
- Language: English

State of Bacon is a 2014 mockumentary written and directed by Jason Cook, and produced in conjunction with the Blue Ribbon Bacon Festival. The film covers the Blue Ribbon Bacon Festival, and follows the festival’s founders and attendees.

== Summary ==
The film follows the Iowa Bacon Board as they put on the world's largest bacon festival. As people descend on the adult festival, including kids, local news reporters, Icelandic Vikings who want to compete for the world's greatest bacon, and PETA, it demonstrates that bacon brings us all together, even those who don't eat it.

== Cast ==
- David Anthony Higgins
- "Hacksaw Jim" Duggan
- Chuck Grassley (United States Senator from Iowa)
- Terry Branstad (Governor of Iowa)
- Andy Fales (reporter for KDSM-TV)

== Premiere ==
The film premiered on May 15th, 2014 at the Fluer Cinema & Cafe in Des Moines, Iowa, with screenings continuing until May 22nd, 2014.
