= Rocky Mountain News =

Defunct daily newspaper in Denver, Colorado

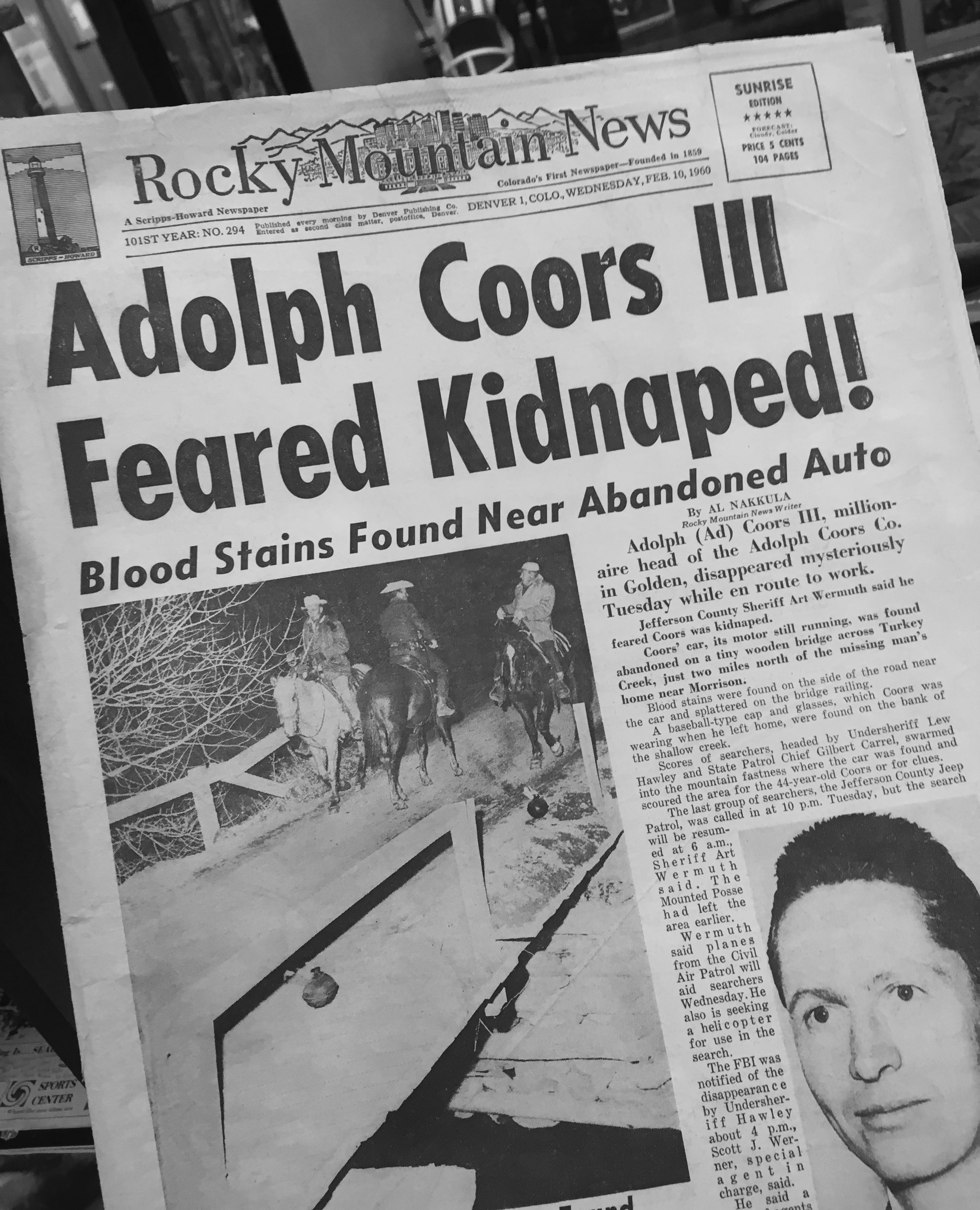
- February 10, 1960, cover of the Rocky Mountain News
- Type: Daily newspaper
- Format: Tabloid
- Owner(s): E. W. Scripps Company, Operated by Denver Newspaper Agency
- Publisher: John Temple
- Editor: John Temple
- Founded: April 23, 1859
- Ceased publication: February 27, 2009
- Headquarters: 101 West Colfax Ave. Suite 500; Denver, CO 80202; United States
- Circulation: 255,427 daily (March 2006); 704,806 Sunday (March 2006) (Note: Circulation figures include combined figures from the Rocky Mountain News Saturday editions and The Denver Post Sunday editions. At the time of its demise, the News did not publish a Sunday edition.)
- Website: rockymountainnews.com

The Rocky Mountain News (nicknamed the Rocky) was a daily newspaper published in Denver, Colorado, from April 23, 1859, until February 27, 2009. It was owned by the E. W. Scripps Company from 1926 until its closing. As of March 2006, the Monday–Friday circulation was 255,427. From the 1940s until 2009, the newspaper was printed in a tabloid format.

Under the leadership of president, publisher, and editor John Temple, the Rocky Mountain News had won four Pulitzer Prizes since 2000. Most recently in 2006, the newspaper won two Pulitzers, in Feature Writing and Feature Photography. The paper's final issue appeared on Friday, February 27, 2009, less than two months shy of its 150th anniversary. Its demise left Denver a one-newspaper town, with The Denver Post as the sole remaining large-circulation daily.

== History ==
=== First issue ===
The Rocky Mountain News was founded by William N. Byers and John L. Dailey along with Dr. George Monell and Thomas Gibson on April 23, 1859, when present-day Denver was part of the Kansas Territory and before the city of Denver had been incorporated. It became Colorado's oldest newspaper and possibly its longest continuously operated business. Its first issue was printed on a printing press from Omaha, Nebraska, that had been hauled by oxcart during the start of the Colorado Gold Rush. Elizabeth "Libby" Byers accompanied the press from Nebraska to Denver and joined her husband as a copublisher and journalist at the paper. That first issue was printed only 20 minutes ahead of its rival, the Cherry Creek Pioneer.

The Rocky went from a weekly to a daily newspaper in August 1860, and from an evening to a morning newspaper in July 1870.

=== Crime fighter ===
In 1883, the newspaper took a stand against corruption and crime in Denver. One of its primary targets was city crime boss Jefferson Randolph Smith, alias "Soapy" Smith. In one crime-fighting campaign, the managing editor, John Arkins, allowed disrespectful comments about Smith's wife and children to be published and Smith assaulted Arkins with a cane, severely injuring the editor. The News continued its crusade to rid Denver of its most celebrated bad man, which took nearly a decade to complete.

=== Jack Foster ===
The E. W. Scripps Company bought the Rocky Mountain News in 1926. The Rocky Mountain News and its competitors, including The Denver Post, resorted to gasoline giveaways and other promotions in an attempt to boost circulation. By the early 1940s, the Rocky had nearly died.

It was saved by then editor Jack Foster when he convinced Scripps to approve changing the newspaper from a broadsheet format to a tabloid design. Foster reasoned that the new format would make it easier for readers to hold and navigate and would make advertising more affordable.

Foster's wife, Frances, introduced America's first "advice" column, called Molly Mayfield. It became an instant favorite among readers and was soon adopted in many other newspapers, paving the way for advice columnists such as Ann Landers and Abigail Van Buren.

=== Joint operating agreement ===
After a continued rivalry that almost put both papers out of business, the Rocky and The Post merged operations in 2001 under a joint operating agreement. Through the agreement, the Denver Newspaper Agency was formed. The new company ran all noneditorial operations of both papers, namely advertising and circulation, and was equally owned by the E. W. Scripps Company and by MediaNews Group, which owns The Post.

The two newspapers continued to publish separately except during the weekends, when the Rocky Mountain News was published only on Saturday and The Denver Post only on Sunday; each newspaper had one page of editorials in the other paper's weekend edition. They maintained their rivalry. The Rocky was considered more politically conservative than the Post.

The May 2, 2006, front page of the Rocky Mountain News, before the 2007 redesign

=== Redesign ===
On January 23, 2007, the Rocky Mountain News redesigned the newspaper to a smaller, magazine-style format with more color pages and photographs, full-page photo section covers, a new masthead logo, and different page numbering from the previous design.

The redesign was the result of new presses that allowed the newspaper to print about 25% faster than its old presses, at an average speed of 60,000 issues per hour.

=== Closure ===
On December 4, 2008, E. W. Scripps put the News on the market, with industry analysts saying the move was possibly a prelude to shuttering the paper. Although Brian Ferguson, a private equity investor from Texas, contacted Scripps to express interest, that deal fell-through for reasons that included complications of the joint operating agreement. On February 26, 2009, Scripps announced that the Rocky Mountain News would print its final edition the next day, and that the newspaper's masthead, archives, and web site would be offered for sale, separate from its interest in the newspaper agency.

Following the shutdown of the Rocky, the Post, now the only daily newspaper in Denver, resumed seven-day-a-week publication. A few years later, a study by a Portland State University professor attributed a decline of 30% in civic engagement following the closure of the Rocky.

Two years after the shutdown of the Rocky Mountain News, Scripps would re-enter the Denver market when it purchased the broadcasting assets of McGraw Hill, which included ABC affiliate KMGH-TV. At the time, the Federal Communications Commission prohibited cross-ownership of newspapers and TV stations in the same market, meaning Scripps would have either been forced to sell the Rocky Mountain News or KMGH-TV had the company never shuttered the paper.

== Revival plans and successors ==
=== INDenver Times ===
On March 16, 2009, several former Rocky Mountain News staffers announced a plan to develop a new on-line, real-time local newspaper, with a staff of about 30 journalists. The plan required 50,000 subscriber pledges before April 23, 2009; if that goal was met, the full website, with the name INDenver Times, would launch on May 4, 2009. On April 23, 2009, INDenver Times, the name for the proposed restart, reported that only 3,000 people had subscribed to the premium content subscription model. The three co-founders said that they did not intend to continue the planned business model, and, instead, would create a less-staffed news site, while Steve Foster and several former Rocky Mountain News journalists said that they believed that the original business model of a robustly staffed on-line alternative newspaper could succeed and were looking for new backers.

INDenver Times, still on-line as of April 2018, does not use the subscription model, instead depending on advertising for its revenue. As of October 2013, the three co-founders Kevin Prebuld, Brad Gray, and Ben Ray, editor Steve Haigh, and contributors Drew Litton and Ed Stein were the only remaining staff from the original venture. The site relies on 15 contributors and six "INSighters". On September 7, 2009, INDT.com unveiled a new website design, allowing readers to read the news in a more organized format.

=== Rocky Mountain Independent ===
On July 4, 2009, Steve Foster and several former Rocky Mountain News employees launched a new venture known as the Rocky Mountain Independent. The new website used a three-pronged revenue strategy: advertising, subscription revenues, and outside contributors. Subscriptions cost $4.00 per month and yearly subscriptions were 50% for the first three months, at $24. The 12 owners of the website committed to working for free until the end of September 2009. The website stopped publishing new content on October 5, 2009.

=== Possible revival ===
In December 2014, Denver billionaire Philip Anschutz was reported to be exploring the possibility of reviving the Rocky Mountain News; he had placed a prototype online and was conducting market research to assess the feasibility of a relaunch. The intellectual property was purchased by Clarity Media Group, Anschutz's newspaper holding company, and the web site posts links to articles from Denver television media. Anschutz launched a Denver edition of the Colorado Springs Gazette in 2020, which publishes material from the Rocky Mountain News archives daily.

== Awards ==
In 2000, the Rocky Mountain News photo staff was awarded the Pulitzer Prize for Breaking News Photography "for its powerful collection of emotional images taken after the student shootings at Columbine High School."

In 2003, the Pulitzer Prize for Breaking News Photography was awarded to the Rocky Mountain News photography staff "for its powerful, imaginative coverage of Colorado's raging forest fires."

In 2006, Jim Sheeler of the Rocky Mountain News won the Pulitzer Prize for Feature Writing for his "Final Salute" special report, the story of a Marine major assigned to casualty notification and how he helps families with fallen relatives in Iraq cope with their losses. Todd Heisler won the Pulitzer Prize for Feature Photography the same year for his photos in the same special report.

== See also ==
- List of defunct newspapers of the United States
- Newspaper Preservation Act of 1970
