= Denver Newspaper Agency =

Former publishing company

The Denver Newspaper Agency was a publishing company in Denver, Colorado, which published the Denver Post, a daily newspaper owned by the MediaNews Group. From its inception in 2001 until Friday, February 27, 2009, the DNA was responsible for the non-editorial operations of both major newspapers in Denver, the Rocky Mountain News (owned by the E. W. Scripps Company) and The Denver Post. When the Rocky Mountain News ceased publication, the Denver Newspaper Agency became the publisher of the Post only.

After a continued rivalry that almost put both papers out of business, the News and the Post merged operations in 2001 under a joint operating agreement as the newly formed Denver Newspaper Agency. DNA was jointly owned by Scripps and MediaNews from 2001 until the discontinuance of the Rocky Mountain News.

While the newspapers shared an advertising and circulation department, they still published separately (except during the weekends, when only the News was published on Saturday and only the Post on Sunday; both newspapers' editorial pages appeared in both weekend papers) and maintained their rivalry.

The JOA was dissolved on February 27, 2009, when the News published its last issue. The following day, the Post published its first Saturday issue since 2001.

On December 10, 2009, the Denver Newspaper Agency, was dissolved and folded into The Denver Post & Media News Group.
