= The Bacon Cookbook =

Cookbook by James Villas

- Picture of bacon frying in a pan
- Author: James Villas
- Illustrator: Andrea Grablewski
- Language: English
- Subject: Bacon
- Publisher: Wiley
- Publication date: 2007
- Publication place: United States
- Media type: Hardback
- Pages: 288
- ISBN: 0-470-04282-6
- OCLC: 84838803
- Preceded by: The Glory of Southern Cooking
- Followed by: Pig: King of the Southern Table

The Bacon Cookbook: More than 150 Recipes from Around the World for Everyone's Favorite Food is a cookbook on bacon by James Villas. It was published by Wiley in 2007. Villas is a former food editor for Town & Country magazine, and The Bacon Cookbook is his 15th book on food. He notes on the book's jacket that he was "beguiled by bacon since he was a boy." He describes the appeal of bacon in the book's preface, and in the introduction recounts the history of the product, as well as its variations from different locations internationally. Chapters are structured by type of recipe and food course, and in total the book includes 168 recipes.

The book received generally positive reception in book reviews and media sources, receiving praise in Publishers Weekly and Library Journal. In 2009 the National Pork Board highlighted recipes from the book for International Bacon Day. Chef Bobby Flay highlighted one recipe from The Bacon Cookbook, for "Bacon-Wrapped Figs Stuffed With Almonds In Port", as one of his favorites. AM New York, The Baltimore Sun, and the Star Tribune, recommended the book in articles on suggested gift-giving ideas. The Independent highlighted the book as number 11 on a list of "The 50 Best Cookbooks".

== Content summary ==
In the preface to the book, Villas states that vegetarians and those that do not eat pork for religious reasons are "haunted instinctively by the sensuous, irresistible enticement". He asserts, "There's no one who doesn't love bacon. It's the greatest food God has ever created." Villas asks, "Who, under any circumstances, is not rendered almost helpless by the tantalizing sound of bacon sizzling slowly in a skillet, by the taunting backwoods aroma that permeates the air ...?" He notes that "the greatest and most beloved food on earth" is one of the world's oldest forms of cooked meat. The author comments on the surge in interest in bacon products in the years prior to the book's publication, "Just the 40 percent increase in bacon consumption in the United States over the past five years might have justified my writing this book." The book includes photographs by Andrea Grablewski.

The introduction contains a guide to "the international world of bacon", and Villas compares dishes Salt Pork and Pancetta; and Paprikaspeck and Bauchspeck. The introduction also includes a list of places to receive mail-order products. The book goes over the history of curing bacon, discussing the various international traditions. Smokehouses listed as resources in the book include Benton's in Tennessee, Newsom's in Kentucky, Edwards & Sons in Virginia, Nueske in Wisconsin, and Lazy H Smokehouse in Kirbyville, Texas. Villas instructs the reader in techniques of smoking bacon, how to buy and store it, and how to utilize bacon fat for cooking purposes.

Villas explains the derivation of the phrase "bring home the bacon", writing, "An Old English tradition whereby a flitch, or side, of bacon was offered as a prize to any man who could swear before the church that for a year and a day he had neither quarreled with his wife nor wished himself single." He recounts how the Chinese discovered methods of preserving pork bellies around 1500 B.C. By the first century A.D., Romans had established a practice of breeding hogs for the production of bacon. During the Middle Ages, bacon and beans was considered a staple food for the poor. According to Villas, bacon was eaten aboard the Mayflower, and was a staple food product in the early American colonies. Villas describes how Oscar F. Mayer began to package sliced bacon for his customers during the 1920s. The author describes contemporary practices of utilizing old-fashioned style curing and smoking methods by food manufacturers in the United States.

Chapters are structured according to each type of recipe, including main course, soup, and breads. 168 recipes from the United States and globally are included in the book. The author notes that bacon is not as bad nutritionally as had previously been thought. He compares the nutritional characteristics of two slices of cooked bacon to one pork hot dog, noting that the bacon contains approximately "73 calories, 202 milligrams of sodium, 6 grams of fat and 11 milligrams of cholesterol", while the hot dog has "182 calories, 638 milligrams of sodium, 17 grams of fat and 29 milligrams of cholesterol". "If health concerns sometimes make you feel guilty about loving bacon ... relax ...yes, it’s high in sodium and fat, but if eaten in moderation or used as a flavoring agent ... it is a guilt free indulgence," writes Villas. Breakfast dishes include French Cheese and Bacon souffle, and Bacon Scrapple. A recipe for BLT sandwich is included in the section on sandwiches, but the majority of Villas's other sandwich recipes are more extreme, and include ingredients such as Jamaican smoked fish. Dishes that contain vegetables include Lima Bean and Bacon Casserole; and Spanish Chicken, Bacon, Meatball and Chickpea Stew. For dessert, Villas includes six recipes such as bacon-wrapped figs, and Bacon and Peanut Butter Chocolate Truffles, and Portuguese Egg and Bacon Pudding.

== Background ==
James Villas is a former food editor for Town & Country magazine. The back flap of the book's jacket notes that Villas was "beguiled by bacon since he was a boy." Prior to The Bacon Cookbook, Villas had written other cookbooks including The Glory of Southern Cooking, My Mother's Southern Kitchen, and Biscuit Bliss. The Bacon Cookbook is his 15th book on food. In the lead-up to the 2009 International Bacon Day, Villas commented to Pork Magazine, "People are starting to realize that bacon is no longer just a breakfast staple. Bacon is, without a doubt, one of the most versatile and flavorful options in the grocery aisle. Most importantly, a little bacon goes a long way. A sprinkle can enhance not only the flavor, but also the aroma and appeal of nearly any dish. We’re seeing chefs and home cooks add bacon to dishes you wouldn’t expect, like popcorn or cookies, and take traditional tastes to another dimension." Villas explained to Salon, "Bacon has the perfect balance of sweet, salty, smoky flavor, and the perfect balance of meaty and crispy texture." Villas commented to CBS News that his book was part of a growing interest in bacon products, "We have a lot more conscientious producers today, you know, really turning out fresh great product like we've got here in this store. I mean quality bacon. And America really should be out there searching for this stuff. And it'll change your life. It will really change your life."

== Reception ==
"Bacon is a standard choice for many a simple supper, but there is nothing standard about Villas's book. The irresistible smell of bacon oozes from the pages, as Villas shows the versatility of bacon..."

— Rhiannon Batten, The Independent

A review in Publishers Weekly called the book an "exuberant parade of pork fat", and commented, "there's plenty good to be had in these pages". Writing for Library Journal, Judith Sutton concluded, "There are, in fact, several other cookbooks devoted to bacon, including Sara Perry's Everything Tastes Better with Bacon, but with its irresistible recipes and wealth of information and lore, Villas's new title is recommended for most collections." Amy Culbertson of the Fort Worth Star-Telegram also compared the Villas's work to another book on bacon, writing, "His is a more definitive cookbook than last year's "Seduced by Bacon" by Joanna Pruess". The book was highlighted in the "Holiday Cookbook Roundup: Gift Guide" column of The Austin Chronicle, where writer Mick Vann concluded, "This is one of the few cookbooks you'll find where every single recipe makes you want to head straight for the stove, whether it's a bacon, goat cheese, and sweet-onion pie; Russian borscht; beef-stuffed plantains; or braised Japanese pork belly. For those fellow bacon lovers in our midst, Villas' The Bacon Cookbook is required reading." In honor of International Bacon Day in 2009, the National Pork Board offered recipes from The Bacon Cookbook. Bonnie Stern of Financial Post recommended the book, and commented, "Few of us can resist the allure of sizzling, smokey, crispy bacon. Though not usually high on the list of foods that are considered good for you, if you don't eat it often, you can have your bacon and eat it, too. If you want to know all about bacon, have a look at The Bacon Cookbook by James Villas".

Chef Bobby Flay highlighted the recipe from The Bacon Cookbook for "Bacon-Wrapped Figs Stuffed With Almonds In Port" as one of his favorites. Jonathan Cheung, co-owner of the cookbook store Bon Appétit in Montreal, Quebec, Canada, recommended the book to his customers when they asked for books on cooking with pork products. AM New York highlighted the book among its recommendations of "Best cookbooks to give as gifts", noting that the author, "presents a mouthwatering array of recipes to nudge the pork lover." Writing for The Advocate, Cheramie Sonnier commented, "James Villas comes through once again with a cookbook that is sure to please cooks who love both classic comfort foods and exotic new dishes." The San Jose Mercury News noted that Villas "turns his meticulous eye to the cured pork product" in the book, which includes "recipes featuring bacon in every imaginable way". The Winston-Salem Journal observed, "His history of bacon, short and to the point, should be required reading for bacon lovers." The Baltimore Sun highlighted the book in an article "Gifts to savor", commenting that "James Villas covers everything about this trendy ingredient". Marialisa Calta of The Douglas Daily Dispatch wrote, "in the unusual-but-oddly-compelling-single-subject-cookbook category, props go to “The Bacon Cookbook” by James Villas". Writing for the Star Tribune, Lee Svitak Dean recommended the book as a holiday gift for cooks, commenting, "It's all here, from guacamole and bacon canapés to New England apple and bacon griddlecakes and German fennel and bacon soup." "No publishing season is complete without a bacon book," wrote Kristen Browning-Blas of The Denver Post, who noted that Joanna Pruess's Seduced by Bacon was released the previous year. The New York Daily News noted that the book "includes an introductory primer on the many wondrous bacon varieties along with easy-to-follow instruction for more than 150 international dishes, from guacamole with bacon to bacon-duck stew." The Independent highlighted the book as number 11 on a list of "The 50 Best Cookbooks", commenting, "Bacon is a standard choice for many a simple supper, but there is nothing standard about Villas's book. The irresistible smell of bacon oozes from the pages, as Villas shows the versatility of bacon, even bacon desserts – for example, bacon and peanut butter chocolate truffles. Vegetarians beware; these dishes could prove too tempting."

== See also ==
- Bacon mania
- List of bacon dishes
- List of books about bacon
- National Pig Day
