= Bacon: A Love Story =

2009 book by Heather Lauer

Bacon: A Love Story, A Salty Survey of Everybody's Favorite Meat
- Author: Heather Lauer
- Language: English
- Subject: Bacon
- Publisher: William Morrow
- Publication date: May 2009
- Publication place: United States
- Media type: Hardback
- Pages: 224
- ISBN: 978-0-06-170428-4

Bacon: A Love Story, A Salty Survey of Everybody's Favorite Meat is a 2009 non-fiction book about bacon, written by American writer Heather Lauer. It describes curing and cooking bacon, gives over 20 bacon recipes, and analyzes the impact of bacon on popular culture. The text is interspersed with facts about bacon and bacon-related quips from comedian Jim Gaffigan.

== Background ==
Before the book's publication, Heather Lauer was a public affairs consultant in Arizona. She got the idea to write a book about bacon after going out for cocktails with her two brothers in 2005. Lauer explained to The Arizona Republic: "I was out drinking with my brothers one night, and the topic of bacon came up. We had eaten bacon as kids, and bacon was a special thing on Sunday mornings. Somehow, the idea came up about how funny it would be to start a blog about bacon ... I took it and ran with it." She began the blog Bacon Unwrapped, at www.baconunwrapped.com, and a social networking site about bacon at baconnation.ning.com in 2005. She began the blog as a joke, but said, "I started to realize there is something about bacon that gets people incredibly excited, and that was fascinating to me." She completed a cross-country bacon tour of America.

Lauer thought that the surge in interest in bacon products prior to the book's publication was "media driven". She noted that a response to political correctness as related to cooking and food consumption may have driven interest in the product. Lauer said that bacon seems to be "the one thing that people are unwilling to give up". In a post of her blog in March 2009, Lauer lamented those that were willing to posit an end to the trend of interest in bacon. She commented, "Bacon is something that everybody is familiar with and most people grew up eating. It has a comfort aspect to it and a familiarity. It's also got an addictive aspect to it — that sweet and salty combination of flavors." She asserted that interest in the product is as much due to the culture surrounding it as to bacon itself. "Current food trends focus on eating real and eating local, and there's nothing more real than a delicious strip of bacon. In many U.S. cities, local producers and chefs are making a name for themselves because of bacon," said Lauer. She stated that "most chefs would admit that bacon has long been one of their secret weapons in the kitchen."

Lauer remains active in Idaho politics and helped found the Idaho Freedom Foundation and People United for Privacy.

== Book ==
Bacon: A Love Story contains information on cooking and curing bacon, including "time-honored methods and traditions". The book analyzes how bacon has affected popular culture. Lauer includes information on chefs who love bacon and venues that serve the product throughout the United States. The book contains over 20 recipes for dishes made with bacon, including Bacon Bloody Mary, Bacon-Wrapped Tater Tots, Bacon Bleu Salad, and bacon brownies. Another recipe is Bristol Bacon by chef Duncan Bristol, who owns the restaurant Brick 29 in Nampa, Idaho. Interspersed throughout the book are bits about bacon from comedian Jim Gaffigan, and random information such as that "Cracker Barrel serves 124 million slices of bacon per year". Lauer notes, "Speck is the direct German translation of the word 'bacon'", and observes that the word "creates cross-cultural confusion". The book's "Bacon 411" section provides further information on the product.

Bacon: A Love Story features a tour of country-style bacon outfits, profiles bacon-loving chefs, includes a "Bacon 411" resource section, has cooking tips and has 20 bacon recipes.

The book was marketed as the "most comprehensive book about bacon to date". Lauer promoted her book in a September 2009 appearance as a co-host at the Blue Ribbon Bacon Tour in Pennsylvania, hosted by fellow bacon blogger Jason Mosley (Mr. Baconpants, at mrbaconpants.com).

== Reception ==
Writing for The Sacramento Bee, Allen Pierleoni recommended the book as a gift for Father's Day, and called the work "entertaining and informational, full of anecdotes, history, recipes and explanations of what pork belly has brought to the popular culture". Rita Zekas of the Toronto Star also recommended the book as a Father's Day gift.

Kerry J. Byrne noted that the book covers "everything from bacon-curing methods to bacon blogs" and includes "easy recipes". Rachel Forrest of The Portsmouth Herald recommended the book in her "Annual Summer Reading List for Foodies". "Another of my favorites this year is 'Bacon: A Love Story: A Salty Survey of Everybody's Favorite Meat' by Heather Lauer. A book all about bacon... she profiles chefs that use it, odd finds across the nation and plenty of recipes," commented Forrest. The Arizona Republic highlighted the book among its selection of "Books to help turn pages of summer".

Publishers Weekly reviewed called the book a "voluminous look at all things bacon"; the review concluded, "Readers who, like Lauer, possess a borderline-obsessive love for bacon are likely to embrace this as their new Bible, but anyone else will quickly get their fill."

== See also ==
- Bacon mania
- Joanna Pruess
- List of books about bacon
- National Pig Day
