= Bob Lape =

American journalist (born 1933)

Bob Lape (born Robert Cable Lape; 1933 in Akron, Ohio) is an American broadcast journalist, writer, restaurant reviewer, and food critic.

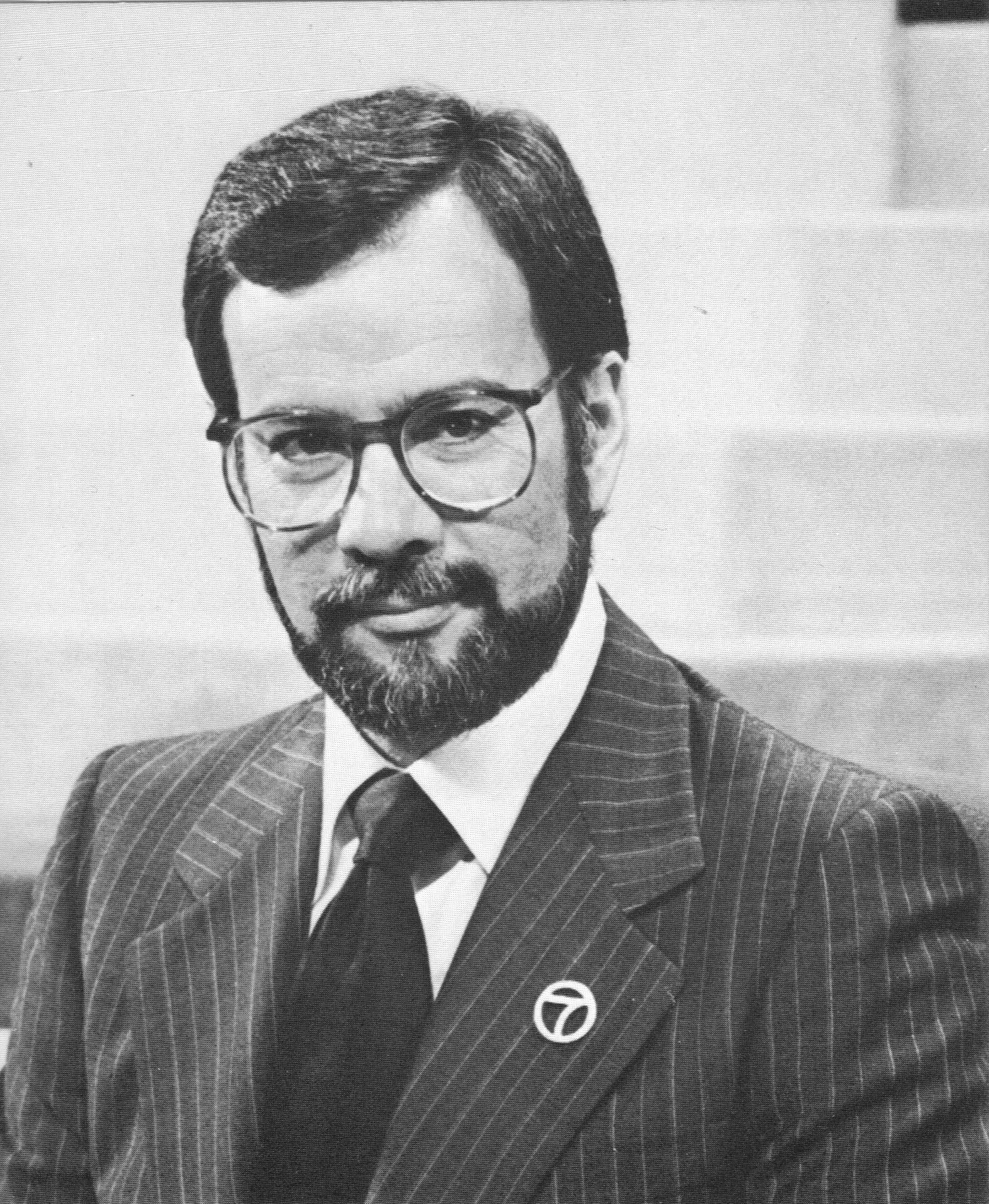
Bob Lape at WABC-TV in New York City

== Career ==
Lape worked as a reporter and news director at WCUE in Akron, Ohio, WICE in Providence, Rhode Island and WBZ in Boston, Massachusetts, before joining WABC-TV in New York City as a charter member of the Eyewitness News team in 1968. Originally hired as a political and crime reporter (beats he would continue throughout his run with the station), as well as being an occasional anchor, Lape started a segment called "The Eyewitness Gourmet" in 1970. It became a highly popular feature on the program, running 1,200 times in 12 years and was called "the harbinger of the Television Food Network" by restaurateur Drew Nieporent. Lape also reviewed film and theater for WBZ-TV and WKBG-TV in Boston and for WABC-TV. After leaving Eyewitness News, he hosted a phone in talk show, Bob Lape's Food Show, on WABC (AM) and wrote a restaurant column in the New York Law Journal. He also served as a network radio news correspondent for the ABC Information Network. His restaurant review column in Crain's New York Business was its most popular feature for 24 years, and "Bob Lape's Dining Diary," broadcast on WCBS since 1986, focuses on eating and drinking reviews, trends and events. Lape is the author of the journals Epicurean Rendezvous, 1990–1996, and Bob Lape's Restaurant Index, 1987-1991 (along with art by Milton Glaser). Lape is co-author with Joanna Pruess of the book Seduced by Bacon : Recipes & Lore About America's Favorite Indulgence ISBN 1-59228-851-0

=== Awards ===
Bob Lape's awards include Kent State University 2022 Alumni Award for Professional Achievement, Chevalier d'honneur Swiss Ordre du Channe, conferred in 2004, and an Emmy Award for TV News Coverage in 1980; a series of UPI Tom Phillips Awards for radio news in the 1960s; and a Congressional Citation for WBZ's coverage of the Great NE Blackout. He led the combined WBZ radio and TV news team, the sole broadcaster on the air for the region.

== Personal ==
He is a member of the Ohio-based Broadcasters' Hall of Fame, The Friars Club, the Commanderie de Cordon Bleu de France, and the Association of Italian Sommeliers. He received his bachelor's degree at Kent State University in 1955.

== Notes ==
- "Robert Cable Lape." Marquis Who's Who, 2006.
- short autobiography
- New York Times. (Late Edition (East Coast)). New York, N.Y.: Sep 19, 2004. pg. 9.18
- New York Times. (Late Edition (East Coast)). New York, N.Y.: Aug 7, 2005. pg. 11.9
- https://web.archive.org/web/20060420171936/http://www.poynter.org/dg.lts/id.45/aid.76937/column.htm
- https://web.archive.org/web/20141204160038/http://www.wheretodineonline.com/home/articles/16/
- http://www.gettyimages.co.uk/detail/news-photo/documentary-subject-and-former-host-of-abc-eyewitness-news-news-photo/485770053
- http://www.worldcat.org/title/walden-1962/oclc/22444449
