= Joanna Pruess =

American travel writer

- Education: University of California, Berkeley; Stanford University; Sorbonne
- Children: 3
- Writing career
- Subjects: food, travel

Joanna Pruess is a food and travel writer and a consultant to the food industry. She is the author of fourteen cookbooks including Seduced by Bacon and, most recently, Soup for Two: Small-Batch Recipes for One, Two, or a Few and Dos Caminos Tacos: 100 Recipes for Everyone's Favorite Mexican Street Food with chef Ivy Stark.

== Personal life ==
Pruess graduated from the University of California, Berkeley, received a master's degree in English from Stanford University, and a certificate of graduate studies in French literature and arts from the Sorbonne. She also studied at Le Cordon Bleu in Paris. Pruess was the director of the Cookingstudio, a school she founded that held classes in a number of New Jersey branches of the Kings Super Markets chain, from 1982 to 1987. Her parents were Harriet and Gerald Rubens of Los Angeles, California.

== Works ==
- Pruess, Joanna (2009). Griswold & Wagner Cast-Iron Cookbook: Delicious and Simple Comfort Food. New York: Skyhorse Publishing. p. 224. ISBN 978-1-60239-803-0.
- Pruess, Joanna; Scott Linquist (2007). Mod Mex: Cooking Vibrant Fiesta Flavors at Home. Kansas City: Andrews McMeel. ISBN 978-0-7407-6865-1.
- Pruess, Joanna; Bob Lape (2006). Seduced by Bacon: Recipes & Lore about America's Favorite Indulgence. Guilford: Lyons Press. ISBN 978-1-59228-851-9.
- Pruess, Joanna; Michael White; Elizabeth Katz (2006). Fiamma: The Essence of Contemporary Italian Cooking. Hoboken: John Wiley. ISBN 978-0-7645-9931-6.
- Pruess, Joanna; Lauren R. Braun (2004). Soup for Every Body: Low-carb, High-protein, Vegetarian, and More. Guilford: Lyons Press. ISBN 1-59228-565-1.
- Pruess, Joanna (2004). Supermarket Confidential: The Secrets of One-stop Shopping for Delicious Meals. Guilford: Lyons Press. ISBN 1-59228-562-7.
- Pruess, Joanna (2001). Eat Tea: A New Approach to Flavoring Contemporary and Traditional Dishes. Guilford: Lyons Press. ISBN 1-58574-350-X.
- Pruess, Joanna; Ariane Daguin; George Faison (1999). D'Artagnan's Glorious Game Cookbook. Boston: Little, Brown. ISBN 0-316-17075-5.
- Pruess, Joanna (1988). The Supermarket Epicure: The Cookbook for Gourmet Food at Supermarket Prices. New York: Morrow. ISBN 0-688-08070-7.
