= National Pig Day =

Event in the US

National Pig Day is an event held annually on the first day of March in the United States to celebrate the pig. The holiday is most often celebrated in the Midwest of the US. It is not a federal holiday.

The holiday celebration in the USA was started in 1972 by sisters Ellen Stanley, a teacher at All Saints Episcopal School in Lubbock, Texas, and Mary Lynne Rave of Beaufort, North Carolina. According to Rave the purpose of the National Pig Day is "to accord to the pig its rightful, though generally unrecognized, place" as one of the most intelligent domesticated animals. The holiday is most often celebrated in the Midwest.

National Pig Day includes events at zoos, schools, nursing homes, and sporting events around the United States. It is also recognized at "pig parties" where pink pig punch and pork delicacies are served, and pink ribbon pigtails are tied around trees in the pigs' honor. According to Chase's Calendar of Events, National Pig Day is on the same day as pseudo-holidays Share a Smile day and Peanut Butter Lover's day. It is an open question whether the holiday is a time to honor pigs by "giving them a break" or to appreciate their offerings (spare ribs, bacon and ham).

== Events ==
In Lexington, Kentucky, a nursing home celebrated National Pig Day with a porcine parade that included a display of pig collectibles such as porcelain pigs, pig potholders, piggy banks, and pigs made from calico and cross-stitches, as well as a real-life Vietnamese potbellied pig named Stella who "hogged the day."

In Pennsylvania's Lehigh Valley, National Pig Day has been celebrated (on the Saturday following March 1) since 2008 by the IronPigs minor-league baseball team at Coca-Cola Park, in conjunction with the first day of single-game ticket sales to the general public. The celebration was described as a "sporktacular" day in franchise history by the team's general manager Kurt Landes who said, "We look forward to doing our part in making National Pig Day an openly celebrated date in the Lehigh Valley!" Highlights of the event also include a pig roast featuring complimentary food and beverages, self-guided tours of the ballpark, appearances by the IronPigs mascots FeRROUS and FeFe and the Pork Racers, and a variety of activities for children.

In Illinois the celebration of the "often disrespected species" is done with "good reason": the pork industry contributes $1.9 billion to the state's economy. When National Pig Day coincided with the Year of the Pig in 2007, described as a porcine nexus, Illinoisans watched a 50 lb (23 kg) miniature pig named Pinto from the Yucatan display sporting abilities (guiding a ball into a soccer net and using his snout to push a basketball up a ramp into a hoop) at the Brookfield Zoo and many fans donned pig snouts and caps for the festivities and parade.

A handbook for first year teachers includes National Pig Day as a seasonal activity and recommends cooking bacon, making BLTs, and discussing where pork chops come from.

=== New York ===
At the Tisch Children's Zoo in New York's Central Park, National Pig Day is usually celebrated with the help of pot-bellied pigs. In 1998, two nine-month-old piglets named Thelma and Louise and their 185-pound companion named Speedy greeted visitors, while the children's zoo also held a "snort off" competition for children. In 2009, the Vietnamese pot-bellied pigs at the zoo were named Oliver and Otis; they were reported to have "hammed it up and stole the show at the seventh annual National Pig Day celebration at the Children's Zoo," though, in general, reviews of the pigs were mixed.

On Long Island a family gives their pot-bellied pig a special treat, refrains from eating pork and prepares a special National Pig Day meal. At the Suffolk County Farm in Yaphank, the Cornell Cooperative Extension celebrated National Pig Day by sponsoring a pig program. Families visited farm pigs where "the piglet cuddled today will soon grow to 220 pounds and wind up in 'hog heaven.'" The meat from the farm is fed to the inmates at the Suffolk County Jail, "so it was a strange day viewing pigs as if they were in a zoo, but knowing that their time was limited... except, of course, for the stud pigs, or boars, and their ladies-in-waiting, the sows." Big Bert was a 650-pound "hunka-hunka burning-love" at the farm. Miss Piggy and Porky Pig were honored and porcine facts presented: the world's largest pig weighed 2,660 pounds, and pigs sailed with Christopher Columbus. Attendees included the owner of Lil Pig Out, a company on the Island that makes pig-shaped candies. "We've got Gummy Pigs and Good 'n Piggy," the owner said in between viewing pigs and handing out pink-colored pig pens.
