= Seduced by Bacon =

Cookbook by Joanna Pruess

- Book cover
- Author: Joanna Pruess with Bob Lape
- Illustrator: Liesa Cole
- Cover artist: Liesa Cole
- Language: English
- Subject: Cook book for bacon
- Publisher: The Lyons Press
- Publication date: 1 October 2006
- Publication place: United States
- Pages: 192 pp
- ISBN: 1-59228-851-0
- OCLC: 61758638
- Dewey Decimal: 641.6/64 22
- LC Class: TX749.5.P67 P78 2006

Seduced by Bacon: Recipes & Lore about America's Favorite Indulgence is a cookbook about bacon written by Joanna Pruess with her husband Bob Lape. It was first published by The Lyons Press in 2006 and contains 90 recipes using bacon for breakfast, lunch, and dinner, and even desserts.

Pruess is a food writer and consultant to the food industry, and her husband is a food critic who has written articles for Crain's business.

== Description ==
Seduced by Bacon contains recipes covering a wide range of bacon-related snacks and meals. It also includes facts, ideas, and instructions for preparing the meat, as well as a brief history of bacon, a discussion of the folklore surrounding the meat, and a glossary of bacon-related items. The book also provides information on the use of bacon, listing curing techniques, tips on buying and storing bacon and the best ways to cook it.

Seduced by Bacon includes bacon-related writings from notables such as Mark Twain and Fran Lebowitz. It also contains photographs and bacon-related poems:

For us the pig's the means, while bacon is the end
Providing gustatory heights to which we can ascend

The book claims that 71 percent of bacon is still consumed at breakfast or brunch. It includes 10 recipes for the early in the day meals and then covers appetizers, sandwiches, entrees and a few desserts, such as a savory bread pudding with Canadian bacon, multigrain bread, feta cheese, tarragon and wild mushrooms "for a sophisticated combination that would be welcome at any meal." In the section on how to cook bacon, Pruess wrote that she prefers to oven-fry large batches in jellyroll pan, in a 400-degree oven for 11 to 16 minutes.

== Reception ==
First printed on October 1, 2006, Seduced by Bacon was reprinted 3 times by March 9, 2007. It was featured on a Saturday edition of CBS's The Early Show in a segment called "Chef on a Shoestring", where a three-course meal consisting of recipes from the book was created for four people for $40. The menu featured a warm baby spinach salad with oranges, red onion and bacon as a starter; Chinese glazed salmon for the main course and pecan, brown sugar and bacon ice cream for dessert.

One reviewer described the book as capturing a big food trend: the use of bacon to flavor everything from pasta dishes to sweets. The book has also been mentioned in more recent newspaper stories reporting on bacon's popularity in the United States, a phenomenon sometimes referred to as bacon mania.

== See also ==
- Heather Lauer
