= Maple taffy =

Candy made from maple sap

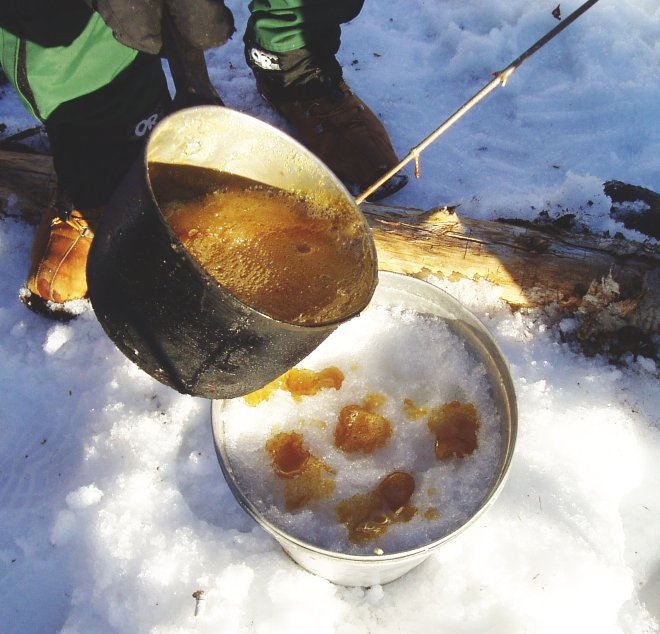
- Molten syrup being poured on clean white snow to create the soft maple candy.
- Alternative names: Maple taffee, tire d'érable, sugar on snow
- Course: Dessert
- Place of origin: Canada
- Region or state: Quebec
- Serving temperature: Served cold after being poured on snow or cracked ice
- Main ingredients: Maple syrup, snow

Maple taffy (sometimes maple toffee in English-speaking Canada, tire d'érable or tire sur la neige in French-speaking Canada; also sugar on snow or candy on the snow or leather aprons in the United States) is a sugar candy made by boiling maple sap past the point where it would form maple syrup, but not so long that it becomes maple butter or maple sugar. It is part of traditional culture in Quebec, Eastern Ontario, New Brunswick and northern New England. In these regions, it is poured onto the snow, then lifted either with a small wooden stick, such as a popsicle stick, or a metal dinner fork.

== Method ==
Maple taffy, a glassy and sticky delicacy, is made from pouring maple syrup over packed snow or cracked ice. The candy is made by boiling maple syrup to about 112 °C (234 °F). It is best to use a candy thermometer. The thick liquid may be kept hot over a very low flame or in a pan of hot water, but should not be stirred as it will form grainy crystals. Once it is ready, the viscosity of the liquid will be more than 4000 times the viscosity of regular maple syrup. This liquid is then poured in a molten state upon clean snow, whereupon the cold causes it to rapidly thicken. If the syrup runs, rather than hardens, and turns glassy and sticky when it is poured on the snow, then it has not yet been boiled long enough to make the soft maple candy. Once sufficiently hardened on the snow or cracked ice, the candy can be picked up and eaten. This is usually done with a wooden popsicle stick. The higher a temperature one boils the initial syrup, the thicker the final result will be. As it is popularly eaten soft, it is usually served fresh. It is most often prepared and eaten alongside the making of maple syrup at a sugar shack, or cabane à sucre.

== Origins ==
Conflicting reports exist on the origins of maple taffy and maple syrup. Depending on the source, maple syrup production began before or after the arrival of European colonialists. In the Northeast of Canada, tribes developed techniques to concentrate maple sap into sugar and candies, calling it "wax sugar." When the European colonists in the Northeast learned of these techniques, they quickly copied the practice of maple sugaring, including making these “wax sugar” treats. In the “Canadian Settlers Guide” it remarks that “the Indian sugar […] is not sold in cakes, but in birch boxes, mowkowks, as they call them.” It is reported that the sap within these boxes would be boiled and stirred constantly to ensure a smooth texture.

New England settlers in the 18th century spent the last weeks of the winter in “sugar camps” to manufacture maple sugar for the year. While making sugar was the main objective of these camps, since it was simpler to store than syrup, it was also drizzled on snow to make immediate maple taffy. According to accounts of early American sugaring, this confection became known locally by a variety of titles, such as "jack wax," "sugar on snow," "leather aprons," and even "leather britches."

While the Haudenosaunee gave the Algonkian tribe the "ratirontaks" or "tree-eaters" designation, this term was likely derived from the "well-known habit of these tribes of eating the inner bark of trees in winter" as the Haudenosaunee also consumed the maple sap. Each tribe has a distinct myth surrounding the maple sap and consequent maple syrup and taffy. The Mohicans believe that when the snow melts in spring, it furnishes the tree with sap as the snow itself is "the dripping oil" of the celestial bear slain by the hunters in the wintertime.” For the Menomini, the maple tree was once accidentally cut by Nokomis, who, finding out that the sap tasted sweet, gave some to her grandson Manabush. As he thought that the sap in its original state could cause idleness in women, he told Nokomis to dilute the thick sap, which would then create the syrup. The practice of making maple taffy does not appear in indigenous stories surrounding the creation and discovery of maple sap and syrup.

Further west, the Lower Nlaka’pamux people also harvested maple sap, but "they didn’t boil it in the olden days; they just used [d] it as a tonic."

== Regions ==
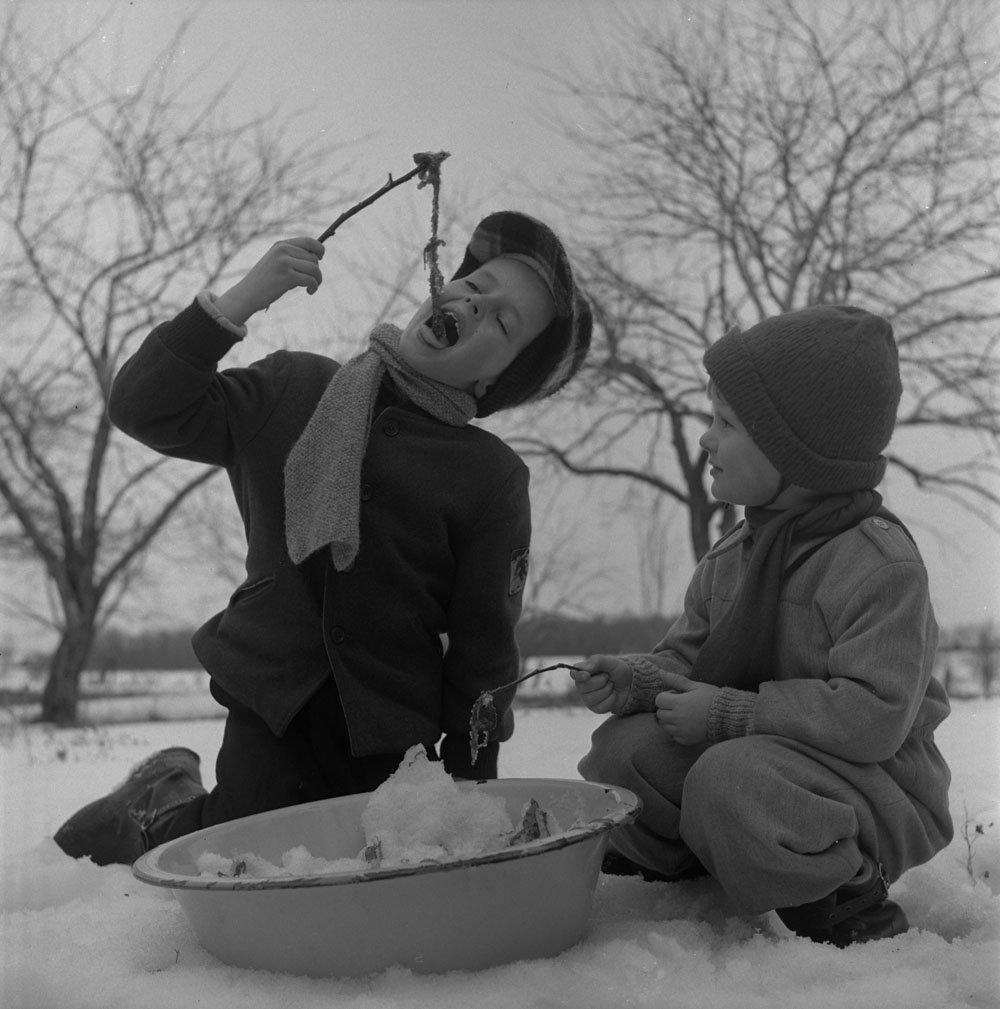
Two children eating maple taffy in 1950s Quebec

The practice in Quebec is conducted in a "cabane à sucre" (literally, "sugar cabin," the rustic, outdoor structure where maple sap is boiled down to syrup and sugar) and the taffy is served with traditional Québécois dishes, including many savory ones that feature maple sugar as a glaze or flavoring element. In New England, the practice is sometimes called a sugar on snow party, and the soft candy is traditionally served with donuts, sour dill pickles, and coffee. The pickles and coffee serve to counter the intense sweetness of the candy.

Maple taffy is also made in the Canadian province of Manitoba using syrup from the Manitoba maple tree (also known as a box elder). The syrup and taffy produced from a Manitoba maple are generally darker and have a mustier flavour than that made from sugar maples.

== In popular culture ==
Maple taffy is one of the traditional treats that can be widely found at the Quebec Winter Carnival, among other French-Canadian delicacies and winter festivities. The Carnival is held annually every February in Quebec City and is the largest winter festival in the Northern Hemisphere, with the aim of bringing warmth to the harsh winter season. Visitors can roll their own maple taffy at the festival grounds, and in a 2020 interview, it was estimated that the maple taffy stand at the Carnival sold an average of 2,000 sticks per day. In 2016, then-Canadian Prime Minister, Justin Trudeau visited the Quebec Winter Carnival with his family, where they were photographed making their own maple taffy. Similar winter festivals celebrating French-Canadian heritage featuring maple taffy take place across Canada, including the Festival du Voyageur held in Winnipeg.

In 2019, Prince Harry and Meghan Markle, the Duke and Duchess of Sussex, celebrated Commonwealth Day with a visit to Canada House in London. The event was aimed at honoring the diverse community of Canadians living in the United Kingdom. During their visit, the Duke and Duchess met with a group of young Canadian expats, who demonstrated how to make maple taffy, with the royals participating in the process.

NHL hockey player Yanni Gourde ate maple taffy on snow out of the bowl of the Stanley Cup in his hometown of Saint-Narcisse-de-Beaurivage, Quebec, following the Tampa Bay Lightning's 2021 Stanley Cup championship win against the Montreal Canadiens, two days after his teammate and fellow Quebecer Mathieu Joseph ate poutine out of the Cup in Chambly, Quebec.

Maple taffy remains a very important part of their culture in Vermont. A great example is the non-profit organization Audubon Vermont, which organizes Sugar on Snow parties. During these parties, they invite the community to their sugar bush to learn how to make maple taffy and watch sugaring demonstrations. This event typically occurs during maple syrup sugaring season in February, March and April. While learning about the time-honoured tradition of maple sugaring and the creation of maple taffy, these gatherings let community members establish connections with one another and local producers. While sampling various grades of maple syrup, visitors learn about seasonal variations in syrup flavour and the specific habitat requirements of various species in the sugarwoods. The maple taffy is served with a dill pickle, modelling the historic traditions in New England. This event is free; visitors can purchase maple taffy and maple syrup on-site. All of the profits go towards Audubon’s education and conservation programs, allowing Audubon to further give back to the Vermont community.

== See also ==
- List of foods made from maple
- Cuisine of Quebec
- Canadian cuisine
