= Maple sugar =

Sweetener in Canada and the U.S. prepared from maple tree sap

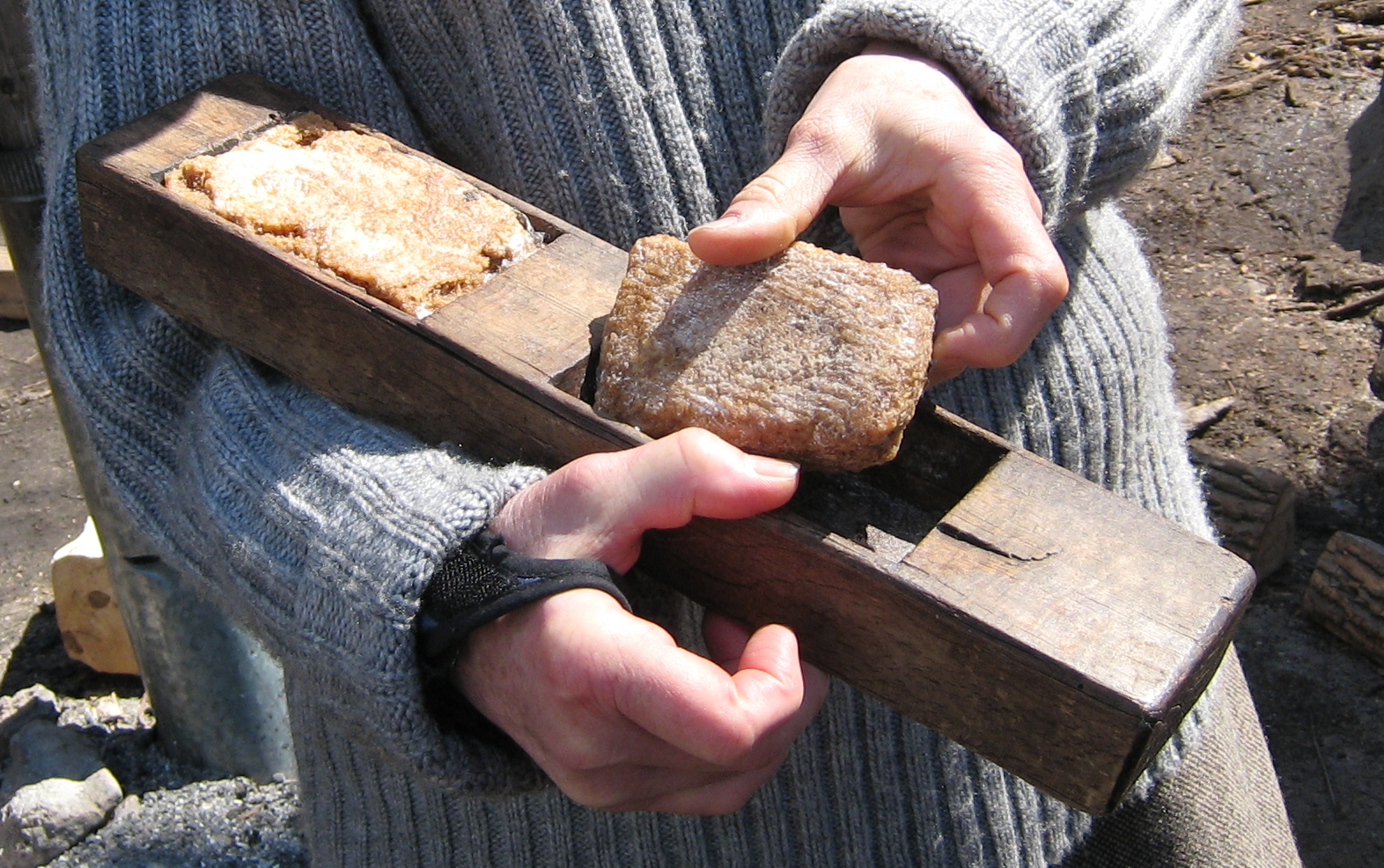
- Ziiga'igaans (maple sugar cubes) being made in a ziiga'iganaatig (sugar press-mould)
- Type: Confectionery
- Place of origin: Canada and the United States
- Main ingredients: Sap of the sugar maple tree

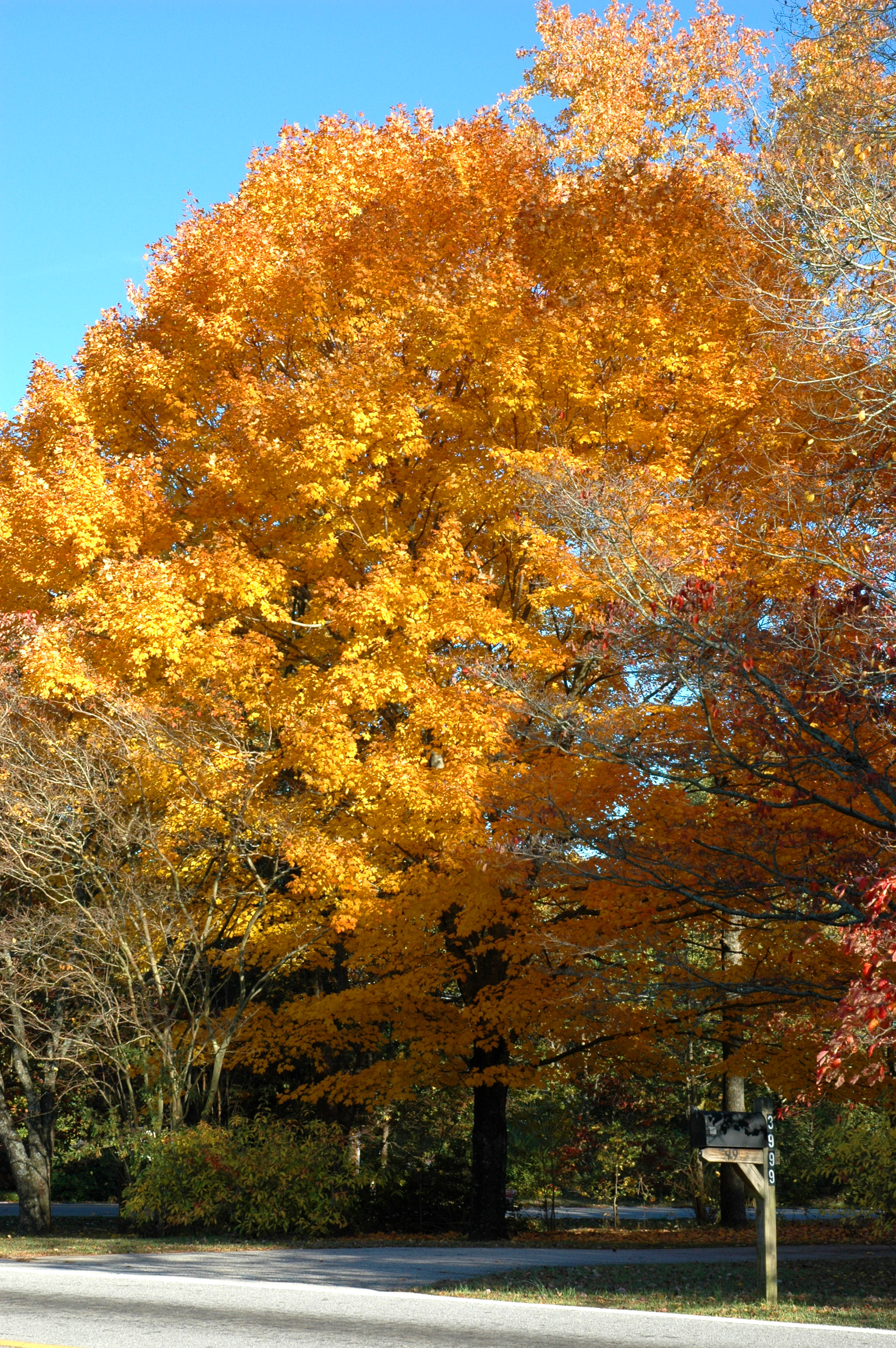
Golden sugar maple tree

Maple sugar is a traditional sweetener in Canada and the Northeastern United States, prepared from the sap of the maple tree ("maple sap").

== Sources ==
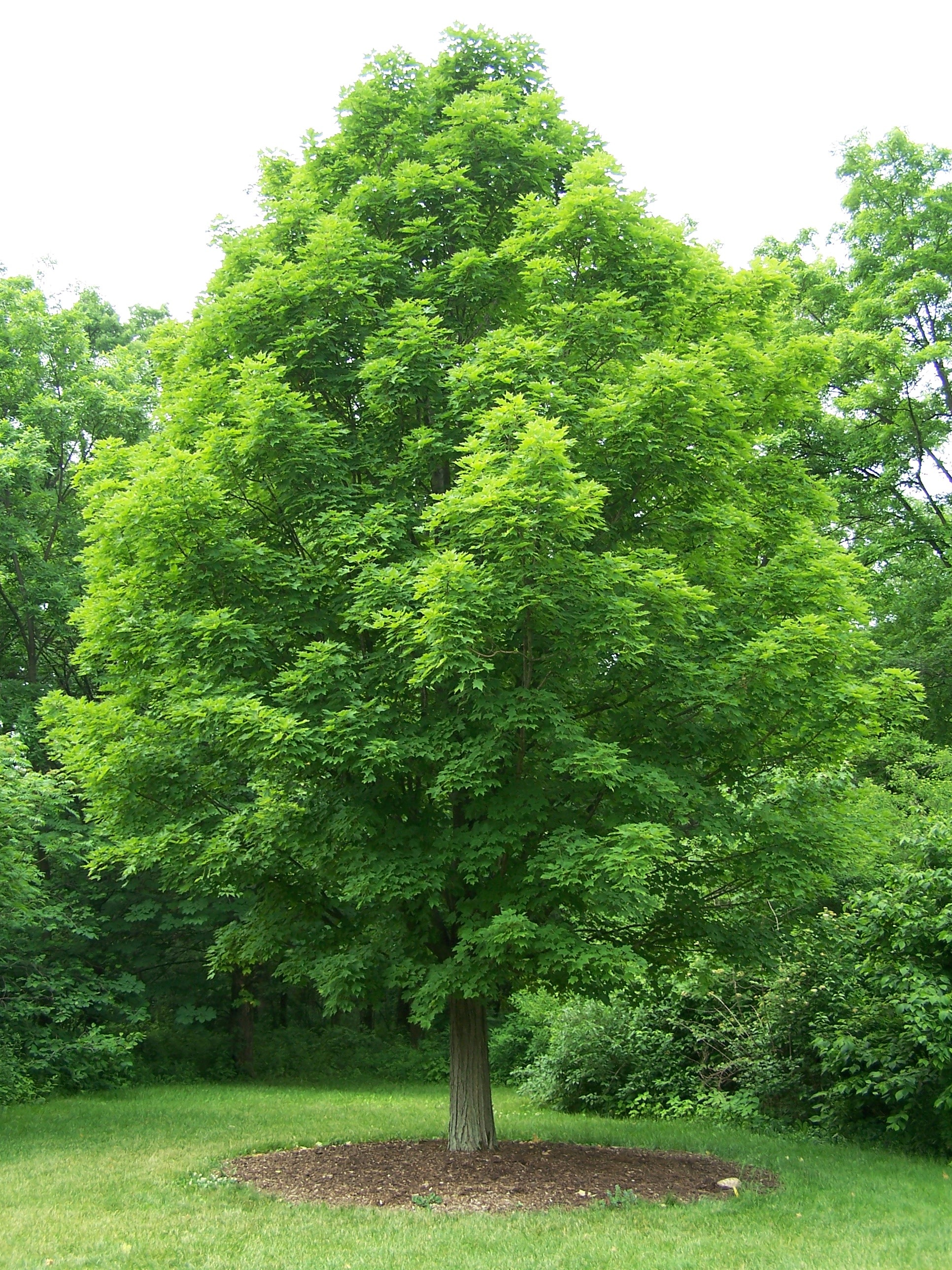
A sugar maple tree

Three species of maple trees in the genus Acer are predominantly used to produce maple sugar: the sugar maple (A. saccharum), the black maple (A. nigrum), and the red maple (A. rubrum), because of the high sugar content (roughly two to five percent) in the sap of these species. The black maple is included as a subspecies or variety in a more broadly viewed concept of A. saccharum, the sugar maple, by some botanists. Of these, the red maple has a shorter season because it buds earlier than sugar and black maples, which alters the flavor of the sap.

A few other species of maple are also sometimes used as sources of sap for producing maple sugar, including the box elder (or Manitoba maple, A. negundo), the silver maple (A. saccharinum), and the bigleaf maple (A. macrophyllum). Similar sugars may also be produced from birch or palm trees, among other sources.

== Preparation ==
Maple sugar is what remains after the sap of the sugar maple is boiled for longer than is needed to create maple syrup or maple taffy. Once almost all the water has been boiled off, all that is left is a solid sugar. By composition, this sugar is about 90% sucrose, the remainder consisting of variable amounts of glucose and fructose. This is usually sold in pressed blocks or as a translucent candy. It is difficult to create as the sugar easily burns and thus requires considerable skill.

== Regulation for product labeling ==
In Canada, maple sugar is one of several maple products manufactured from maple sap or maple syrup, including maple butter and maple taffy. Under the Food and Drugs Act and Consumer Packaging and Labelling Act, Canadian regulations require that maple sugar products identify the business identity and country of origin on the retail product label.

== History ==
Maple sugar was made by many First Nations/American Indian peoples. Unlike maple syrup, it was easy to transport and long lasting. It is called ziinzibaakwad by the Anishinaabeg. Blessing of the Bay, the second ocean-going merchant ship built in the English colonies, carried maple sugar from the Massachusetts Bay Colony to New Amsterdam as early as 1631. French awareness of the process is indicated in at least one engraver's works, those of the mid-18th-century artist Jean-Francois Turpin, the engraver Bernard (including several for Diderot's 1755 Encyclopedie.) and others.

Maple syrup and maple sugar were used during the American Civil War and by abolitionists in the years before the war because most cane sugar and molasses were produced by Southern slaves. For example, Lucretia Mott was known for giving out maple candies wrapped in papers that bore messages like "Take this, my friend, you need not fear to eat. No slave hath toiled to cultivate this sweet."

== Uses ==
Maple sugar is used to flavor maple products and as an alternative to cane sugar.

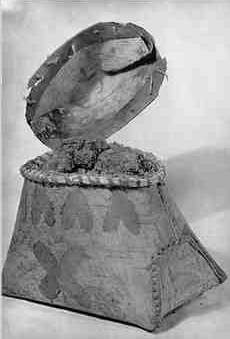
Sugar makak – 1925

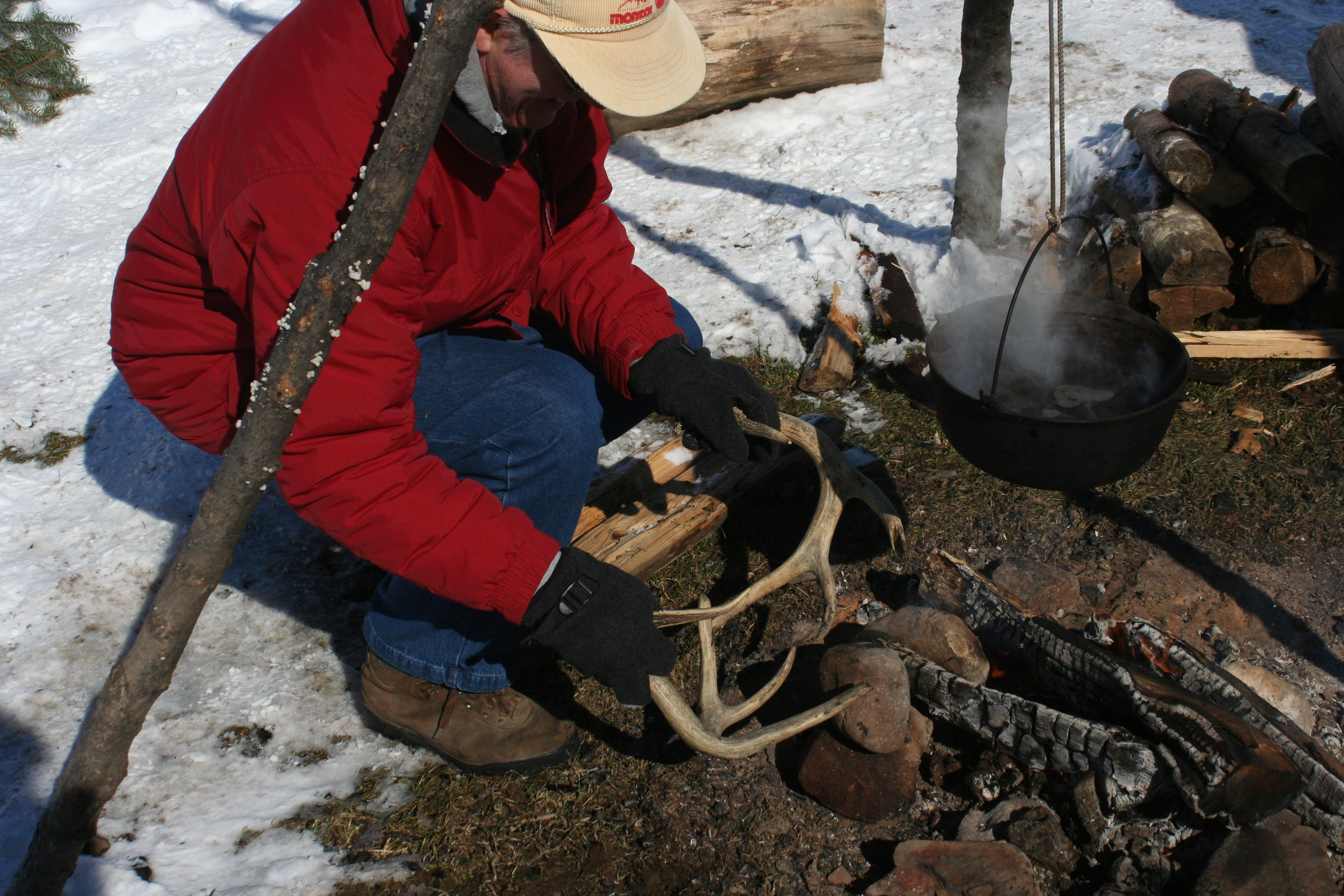
Demonstration of Native American technique of making maple sugar

== See also ==
- List of foods made from maple

== Sources ==
- Ciesla, William M (2002). Non-wood Forest Products from Temperate Broad-leaved Trees. Food and Agriculture Organization of the United Nations. ISBN 978-92-5-104855-9.
- Elliot, Elaine (2006). Maple Syrup: Recipes from Canada's Best Chefs. Formac Publishing Company. ISBN 978-0-88780-697-1.
