= List of foods made from maple =

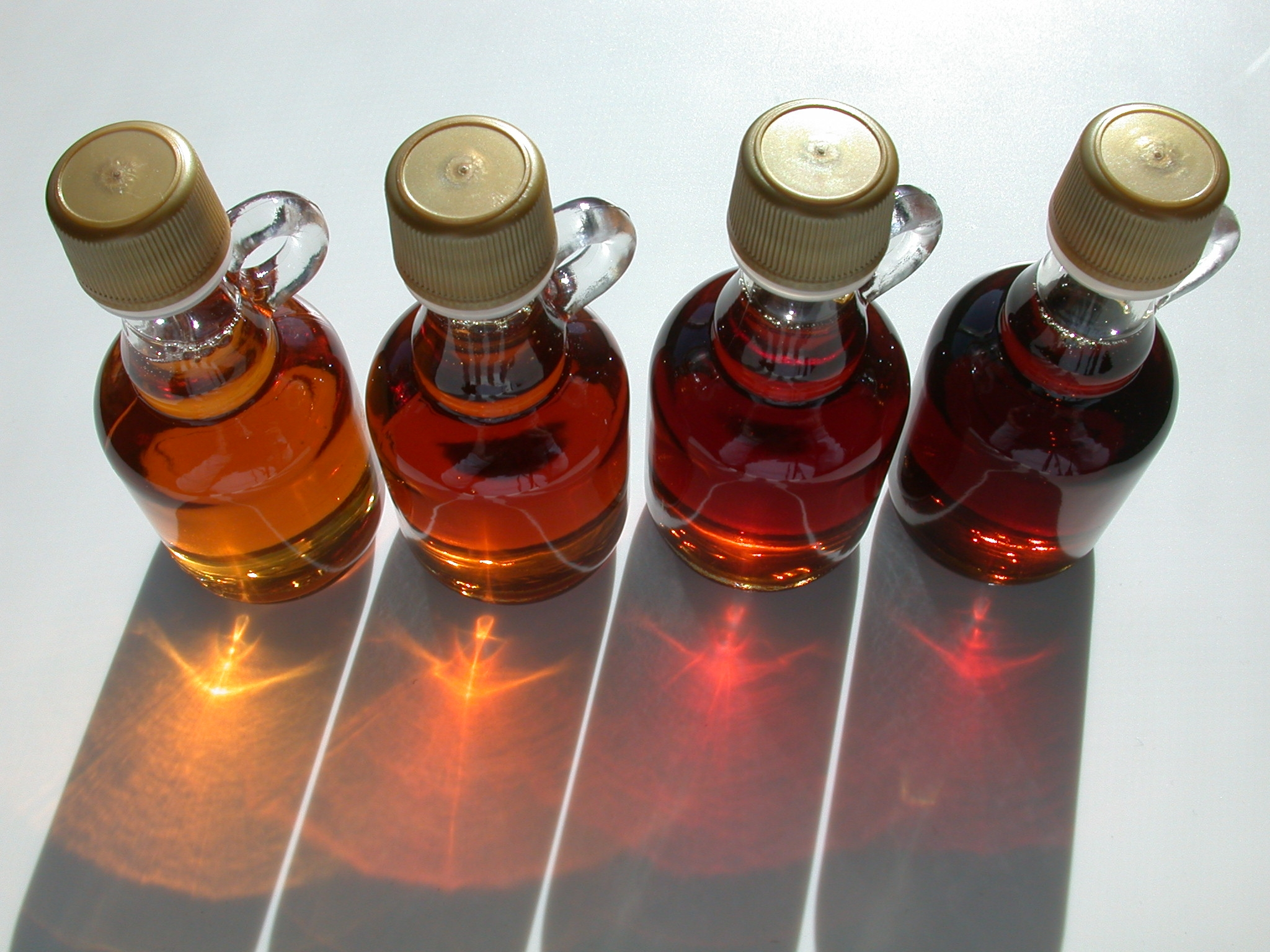
U.S. maple syrup, Grade A varieties, left to right: Golden Colour and Delicate Taste, Amber Color and Rich Taste, Dark Color and Robust Taste, Very Dark Color and Strong Taste

Several food products are created from the sap harvested from maple trees, which is made into sugar and syrup before being incorporated into various foods and dishes. The sugar maple is one of the most important Canadian trees, being, along with the black maple, the major source of sap for making maple syrup. Other maple species can be used as a sap source for maple syrup, but some have lower sugar contents or produce more cloudy syrup than these two.

== Foods made from maple ==
- Maple syrup – in maple syrup production from the sugar maple, the sap is extracted from the trees using tap placed into a hole drilled through the phloem, just inside the bark. The collected sap is then boiled. As the sap boils, the water is evaporated off and the syrup left behind. 40 litres (8.8 imp gal; 11 US gal) of maple sap are required to be boiled to produce only 1 litre (0.22 imp gal; 0.26 US gal) of pure syrup. This is the reason for the high cost of pure maple syrup. Maple syrup is often eaten with pancakes, waffles, French toast, or oatmeal and porridge. It is also used as an ingredient in baking, and as a sweetener or flavoring agent.
- Maple taffy – also known as maple toffee, is a confection made by boiling maple sap past the point where it would form maple syrup but not so long that it becomes maple butter or maple sugar. It is sometimes prepared and eaten alongside during the making of maple syrup at a sugar house or cabane à sucre.
- Maple sugar – prepared from the sap of the sugar maple tree, it is a traditional sweetener in Canada and the northeastern United States. Maple sugar is what remains after the sap of the sugar maple is boiled for longer than is needed to create maple syrup or maple taffy. Once almost all the water has been boiled off, all that is left is a solid sugar. Maple sugar was the preferred form of maple by First Nations/Native American peoples as the sugar could easily be transported and lasted a long time. It is called ziinzibaakwad by the Anishinaabeg. Blessing of the Bay, the second ocean-going merchant ship built in the English colonies, carried maple sugar from the Massachusetts Bay Colony to New Amsterdam as early as 1631. Today, specialty candy shops still carry "maple sugar candy": an individual-consumption-sized block of compacted maple sugar, usually molded into the shape of a maple leaf.
- Maple butter – also known as maple cream or maple spread, it is a confection made by heating maple syrup to approximately 112 °C (234 °F), cooling it to around 52 °C (126 °F), and stirring it until it reaches a smooth consistency. It is usually made from Grade A Golden Color and Delicate Taste syrup (previously known as "Fancy" or "Vermont Fancy"), and is a light tan color. 1 US gallon (3.8 L; 0.83 imp gal) of syrup can make about 3 kilograms (6.6 lb) of maple cream.

=== Beverages ===
- Jaan Paan Liqueur – a sweet paan-flavored spirit/liqueur made with neutral grain spirit, Canadian maple syrup and a blend of herbs and spices, excluding areca nut.
- Maple liqueur – various alcoholic products made from maple syrup, primarily in the Northeast United States and Canada.
- Maple beer – by fermenting the sugar in maple syrup to replace malt and other components, craft brewers create an ale with noticeable maple tones that is often reinforced in sweetness with residual sugars. However, due to maple syrup being more expensive than traditional sources of sugar, this beverage is considered more of a delicacy.
- Hot Toddy – contains whiskey, lemon, and may be made with maple syrup instead of honey.

=== Baked goods ===
- Maple bar – a rectangular doughnut topped with a maple glaze. Varieties of maple bars include Long Johns and Maple bacon donuts.
- Maple leaf cream cookie – sandwich cookie with maple cream filling.

== Gallery ==
Maple syrup

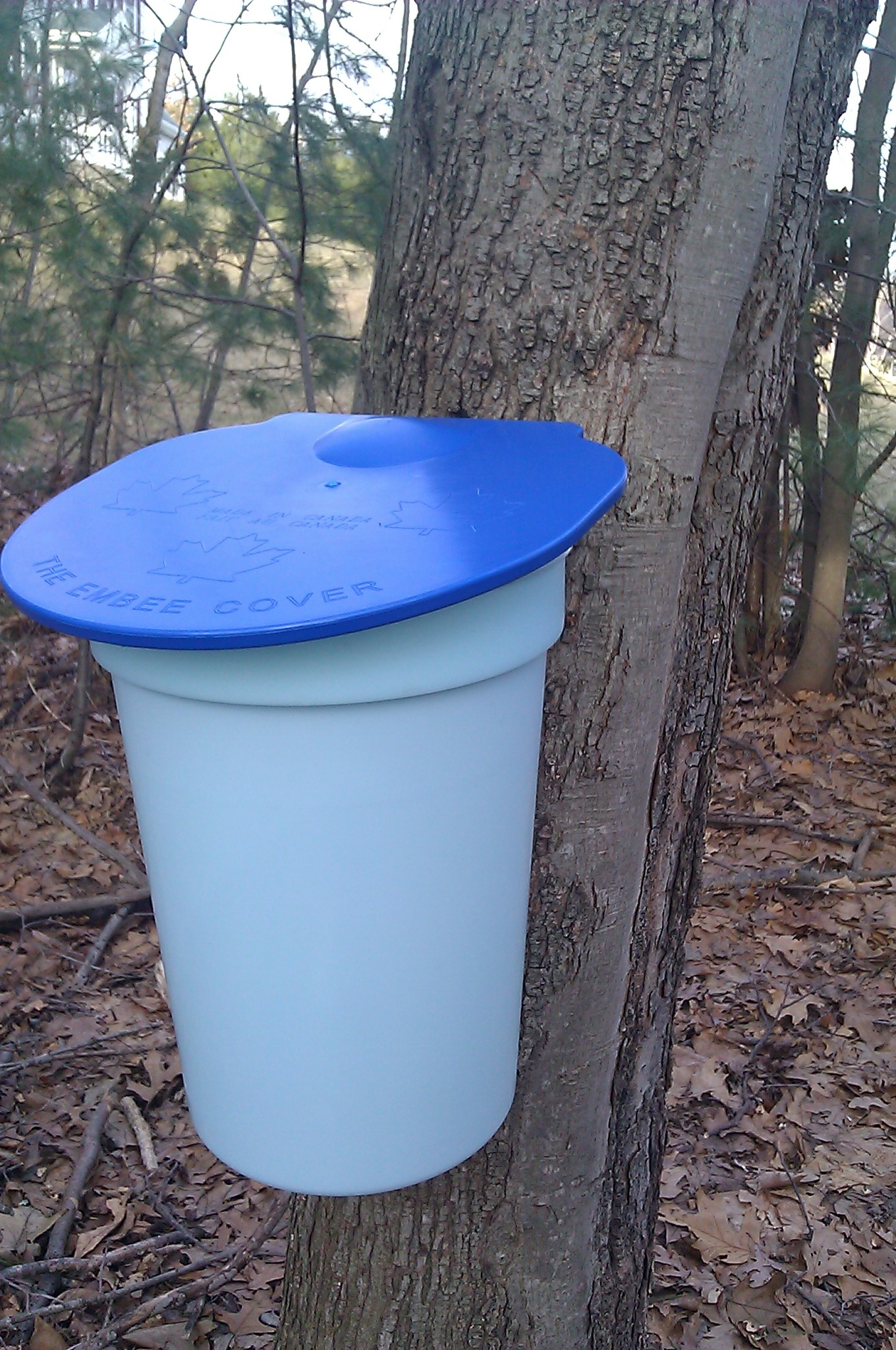
Maple sap being collected in a bucket

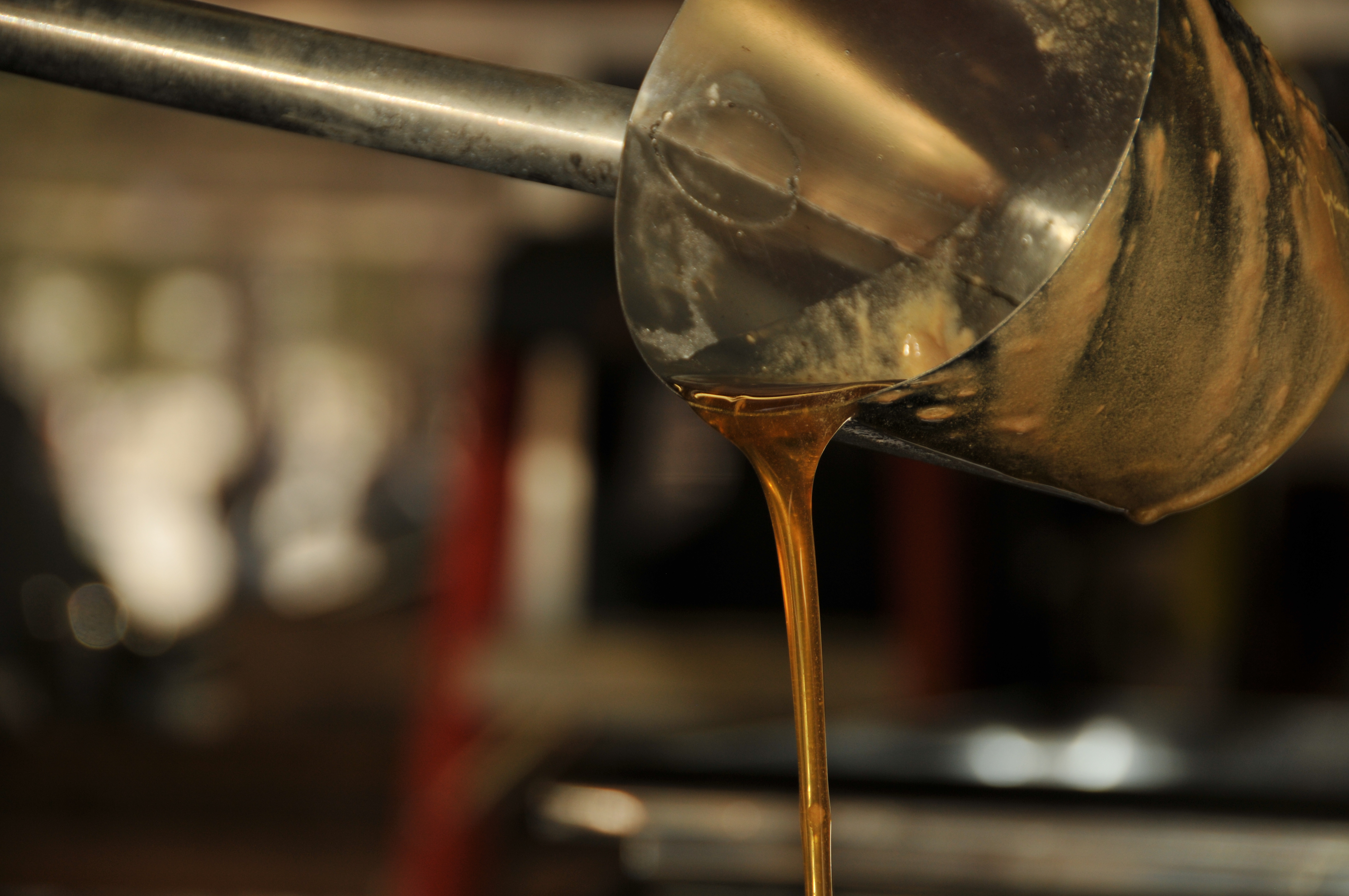
Maple sap being transformed into maple syrup at a sugar shack in Pakenham, Ontario

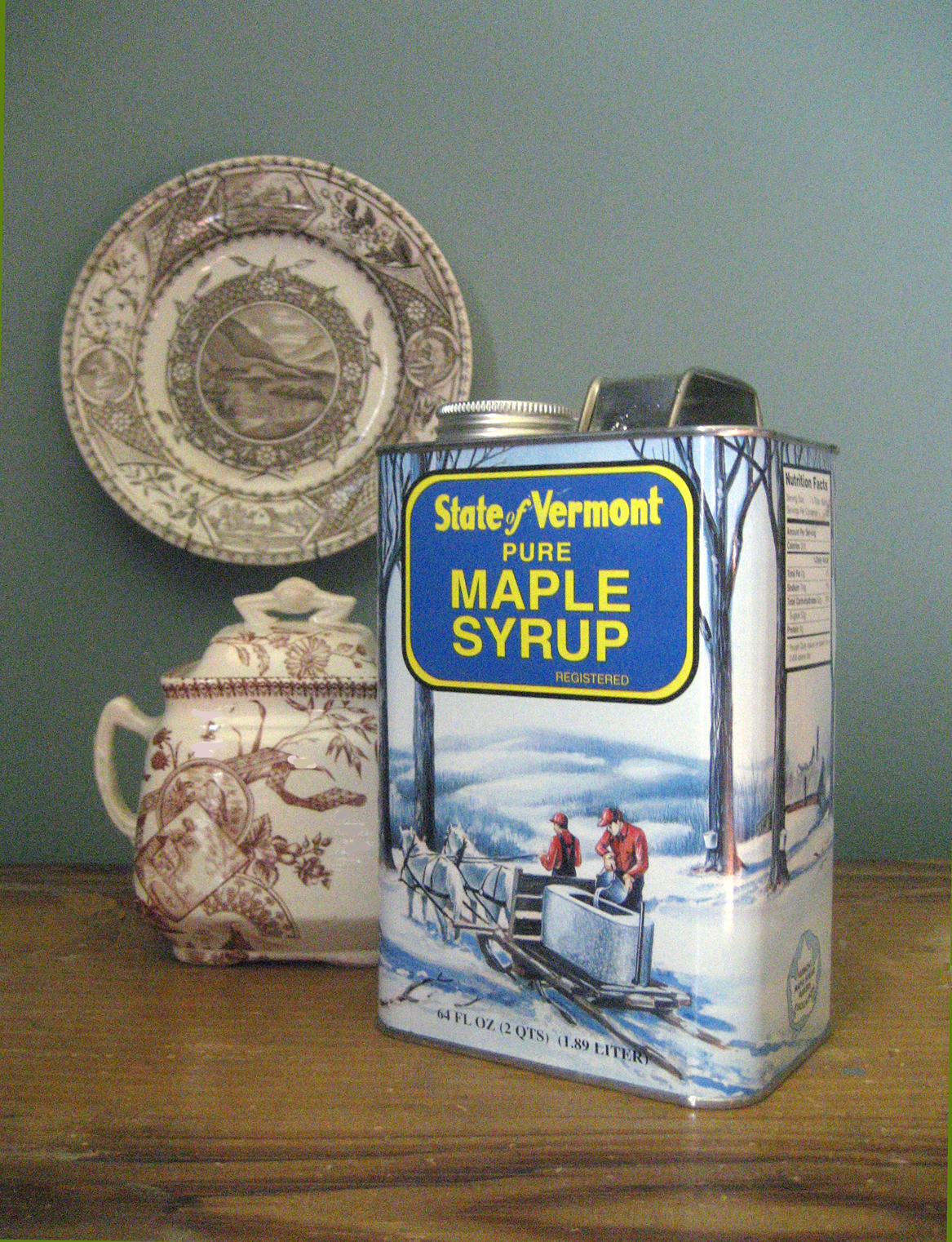
Vermont maple syrup packaged in a tin issued by the Vermont Maple Sugar Makers' Association

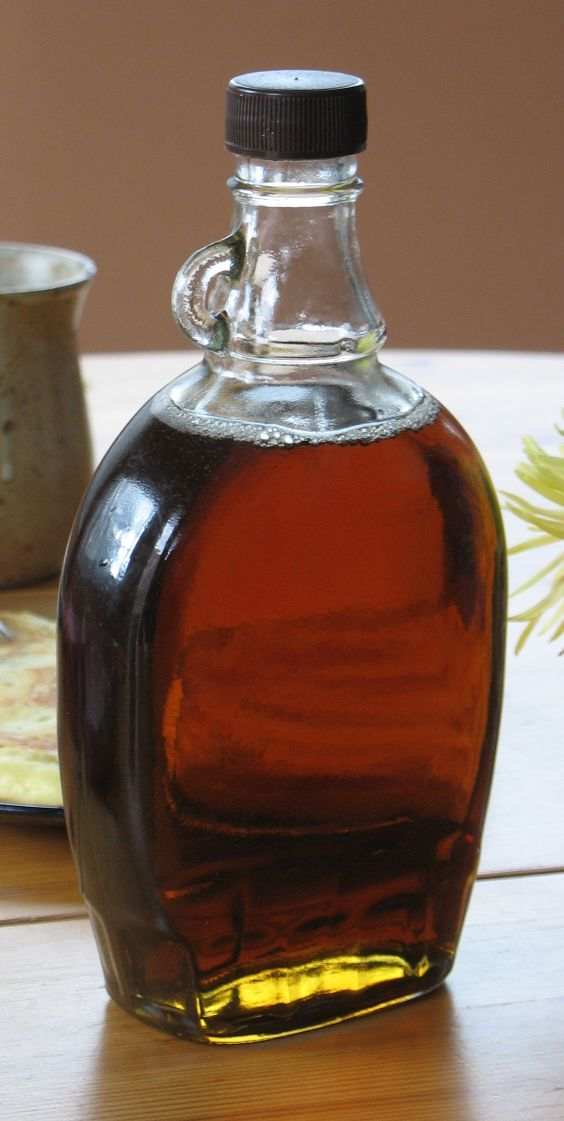
A bottle of maple syrup from Quebec

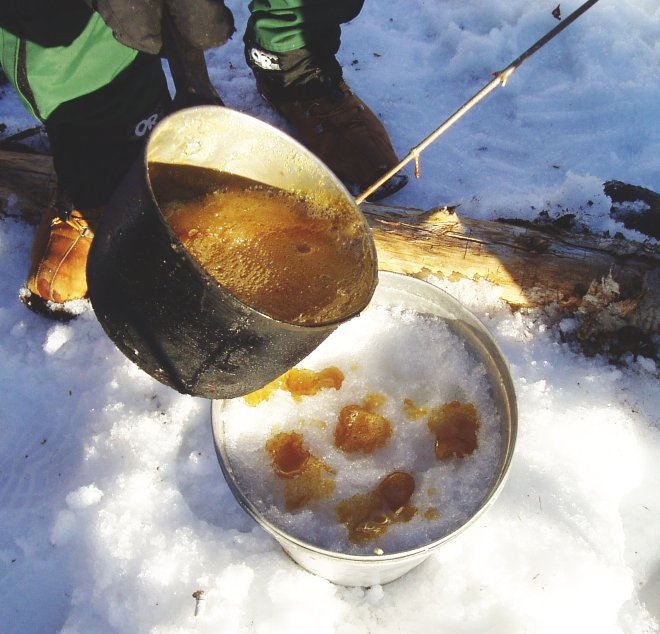
Maple taffy being prepared in West Quebec

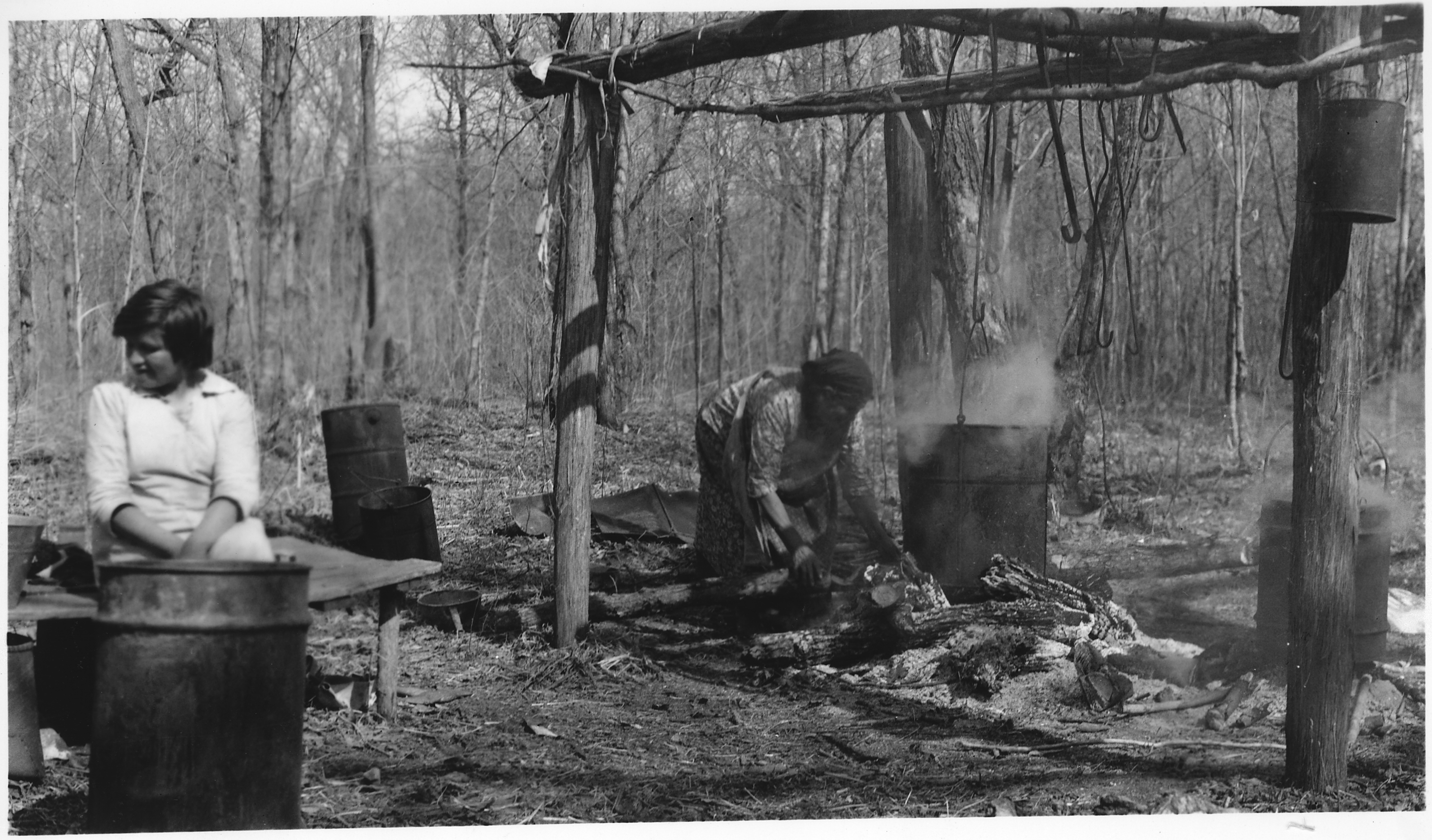
Native Americans preparing maple sugar by boiling maple tree sap

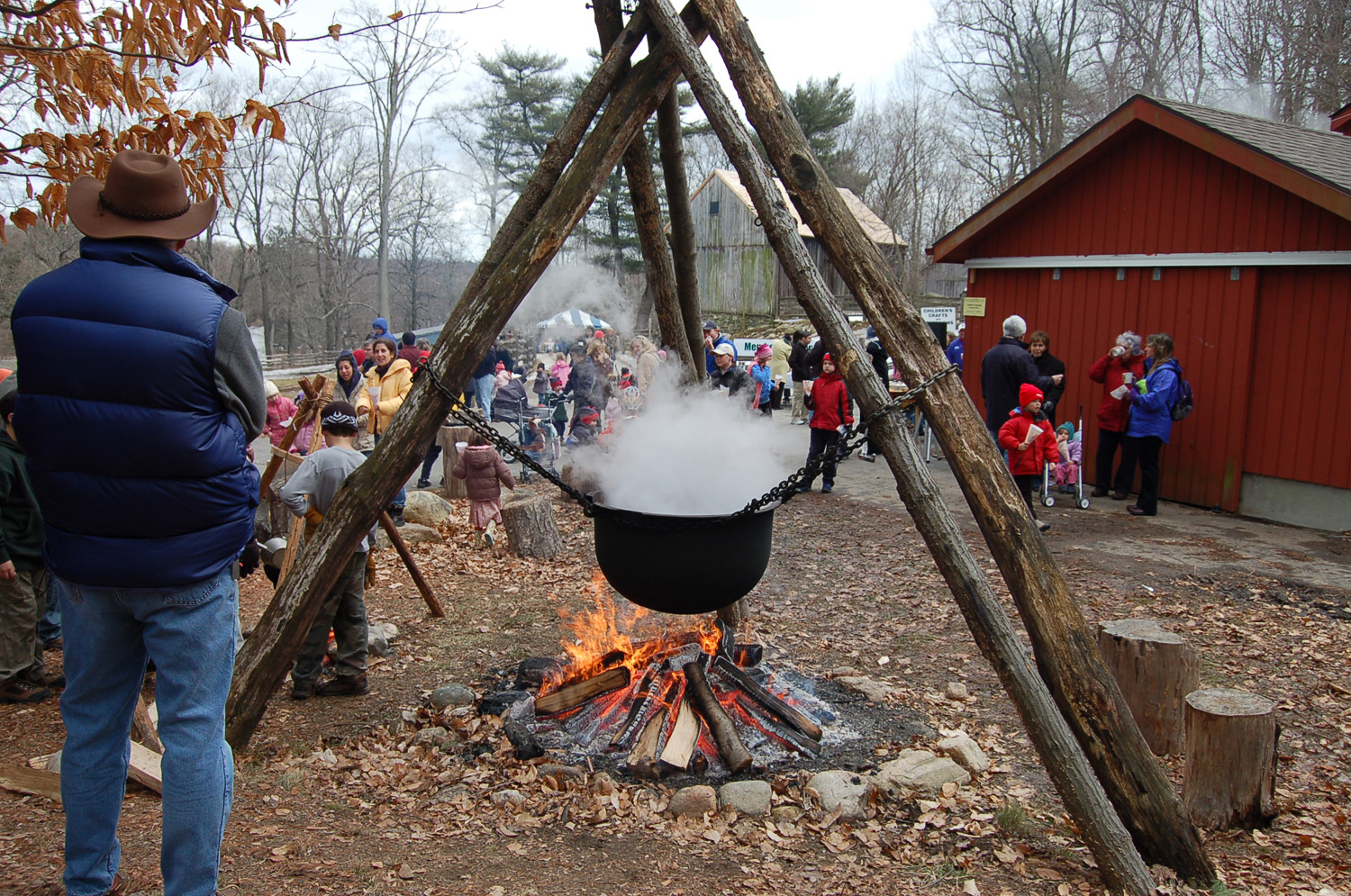
Maple sugar being prepared at a maple sugar festival

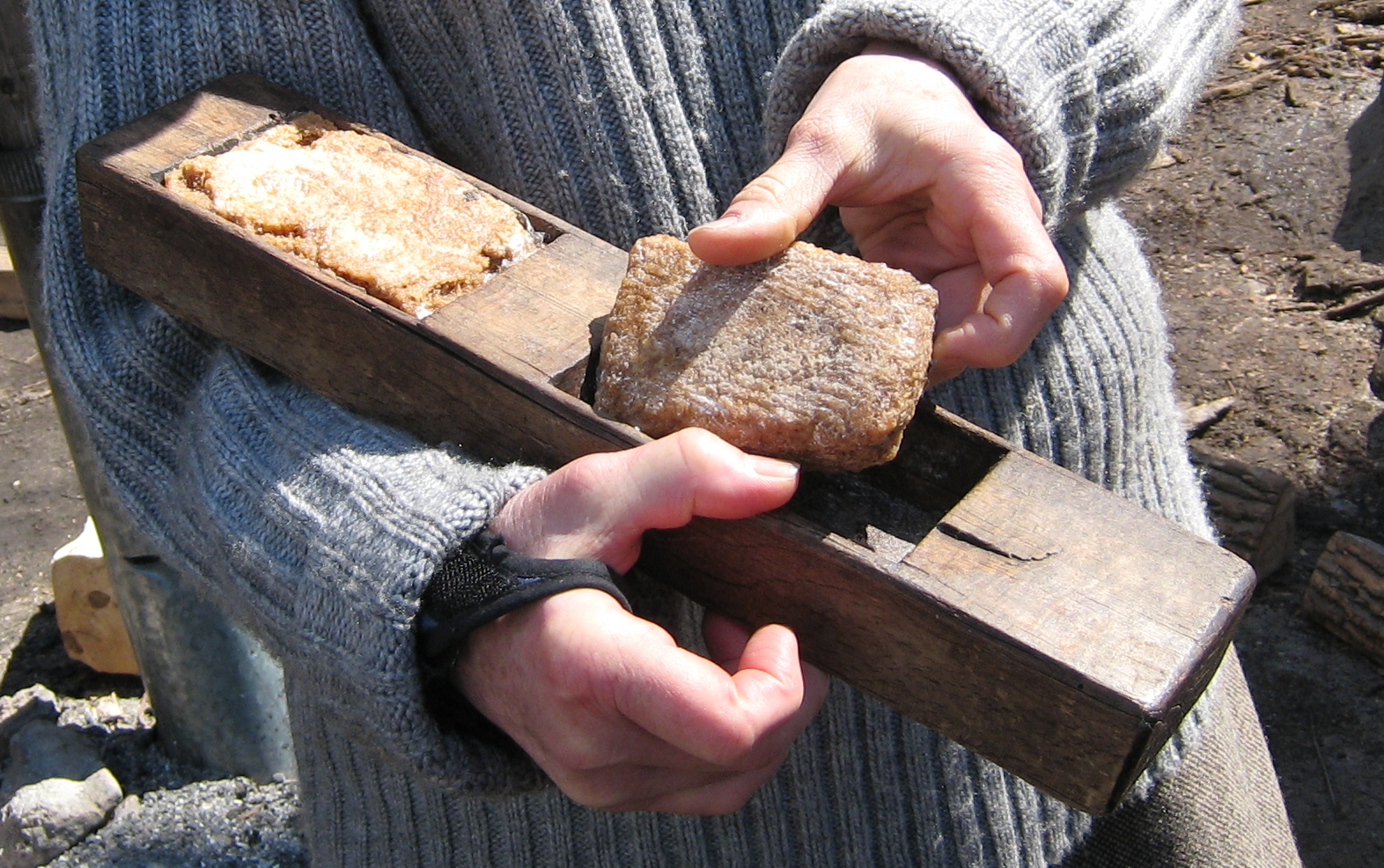
Cubes of maple sugar being made in a sugar press mold

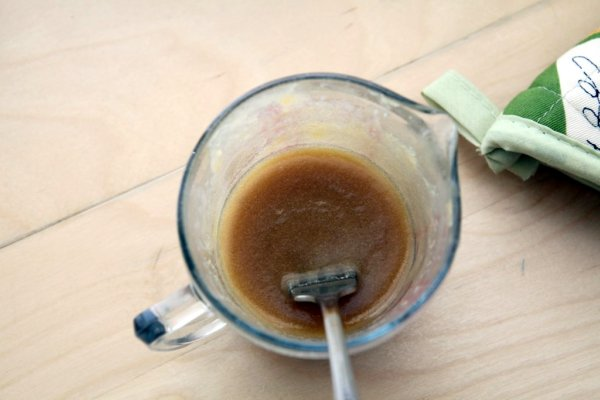
Maple butter

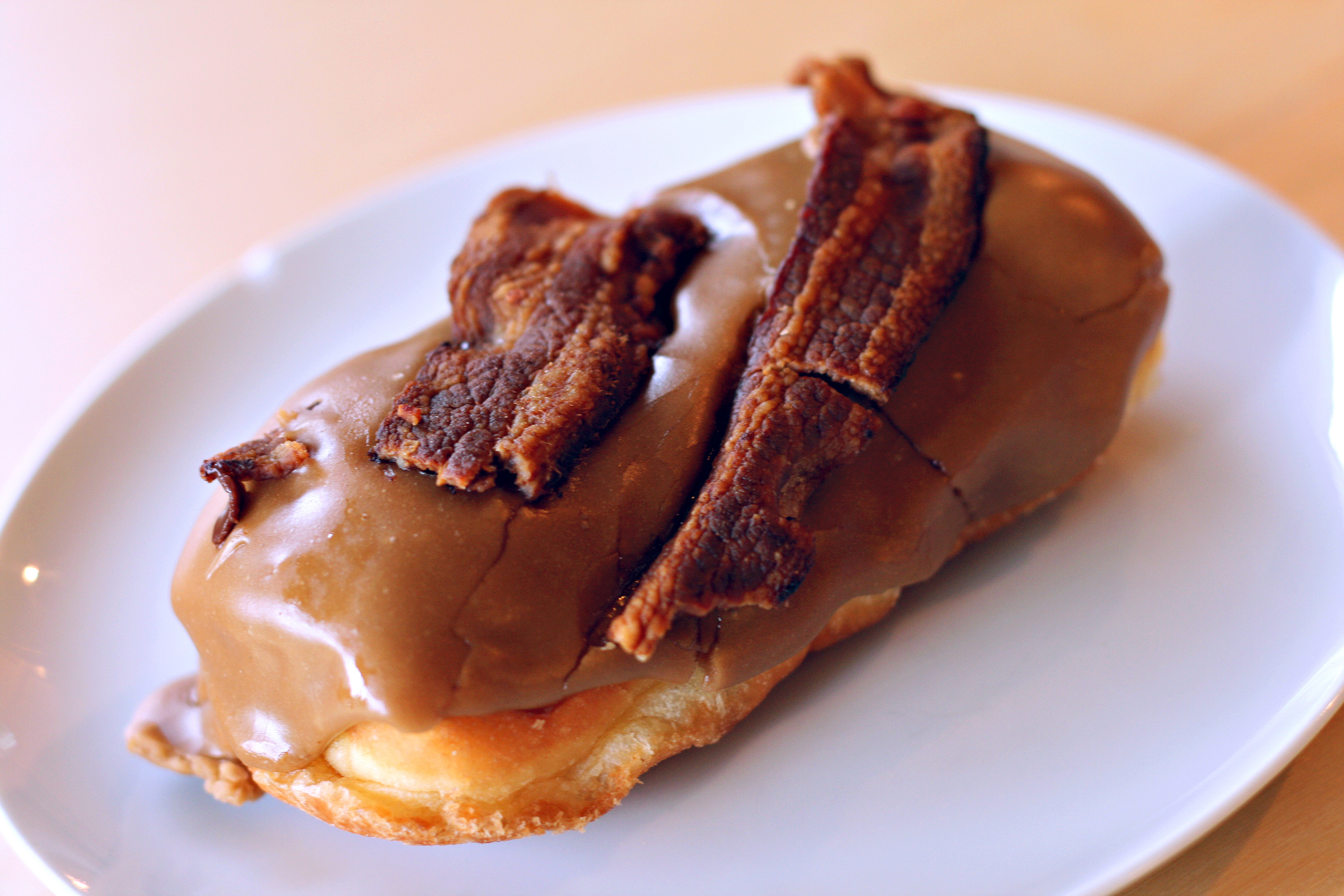
A maple bar, topped with bacon

== See also ==
- Birch syrup
- Federation of Quebec Maple Syrup Producers
- Frog Run (maple syrup) – a term used in New England that refers to the last sap run of the sugaring season. This final run is the last good tree sap that can be distilled into maple syrup. It usually produces a very thick and darker grade of maple syrup.
