= Raised Doughnuts =

Bakery in Seattle, Washington, U.S.

Raised Doughnuts and Cakes

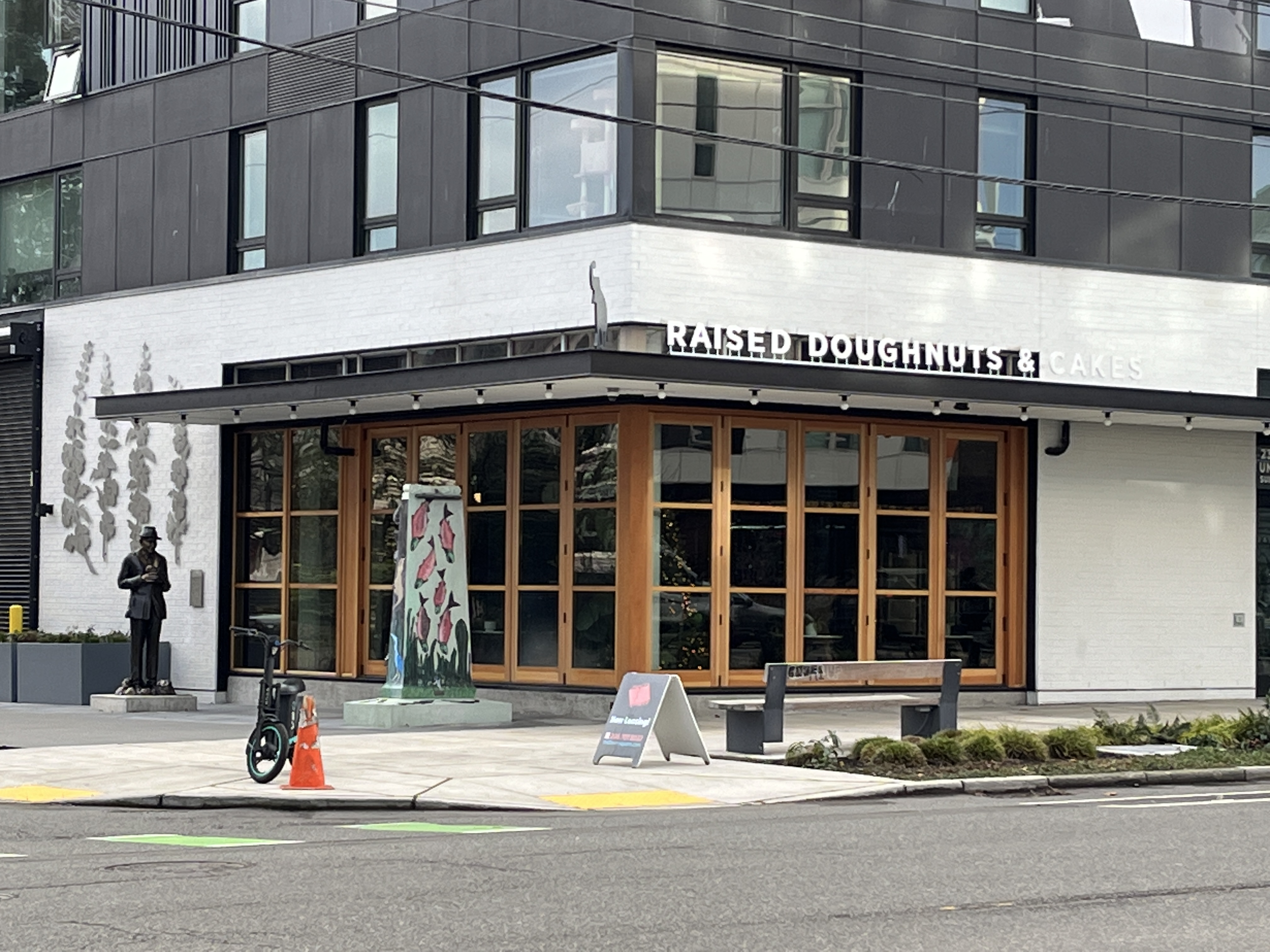
- The shop's exterior in 2023
- Interactive map of Raised Doughnuts and Cakes

Restaurant information
- Location: 2301 East Union Street, Suite L, Seattle, King, Washington, 98122, United States
- Coordinates: 47.6128°N 122.3017°W
- Website: raiseddoughnuts.com

Raised Doughnuts and Cakes is a bakery and doughnut shop in Seattle's Central District, in the U.S. state of Washington. Baker and owner Mi Kim launched the business as a pop-up in 2017, with her business partner I-Miun Liu. Raised relocated to a brick and mortar shop in mid 2018, and has since moved to the Midtown Square development.

== Description ==
Raised Doughnuts is a bakery and doughnut shop in Seattle's Central District. The business operates in the Midtown Square complex. Previously, the shop accommodated production and seating for approximately 10 to 15 people, as of 2018. The bathroom was painted "in a deep red to match [the owner's] popular raspberry hole doughnuts", according to Eater Seattle's Megan Hill.

Fodor's says Raised is known for "airy" doughnuts, gluten-free options, and "creative seasonal flavors".

=== Menu ===
The business has served gluten-free mochi doughnuts, maple bars, raspberry holes, chocolate bars, crullers, and apple fritters. Rotating monthly doughnut varieties have included blueberry basil, black sesame, ube coconut, strawberry pie, strawberry balsamic, Thai tea mochi, chocolate chip cookie, lemon thyme, guava coconut, caramel crunch bar, honey ginger, Fruity Pebble, blueberry mochi, nectarine, tahini chocolate, earl grey, and grapefruit crème brûlee. The "Everything Doughnut" is a variation of the everything bagel. Cake varieties include cherry and chevre, apricot raspberry, and matcha black sesame. Raised has also serves coffee by Broadcast, Dorothea, and Fidalgo.

== History ==
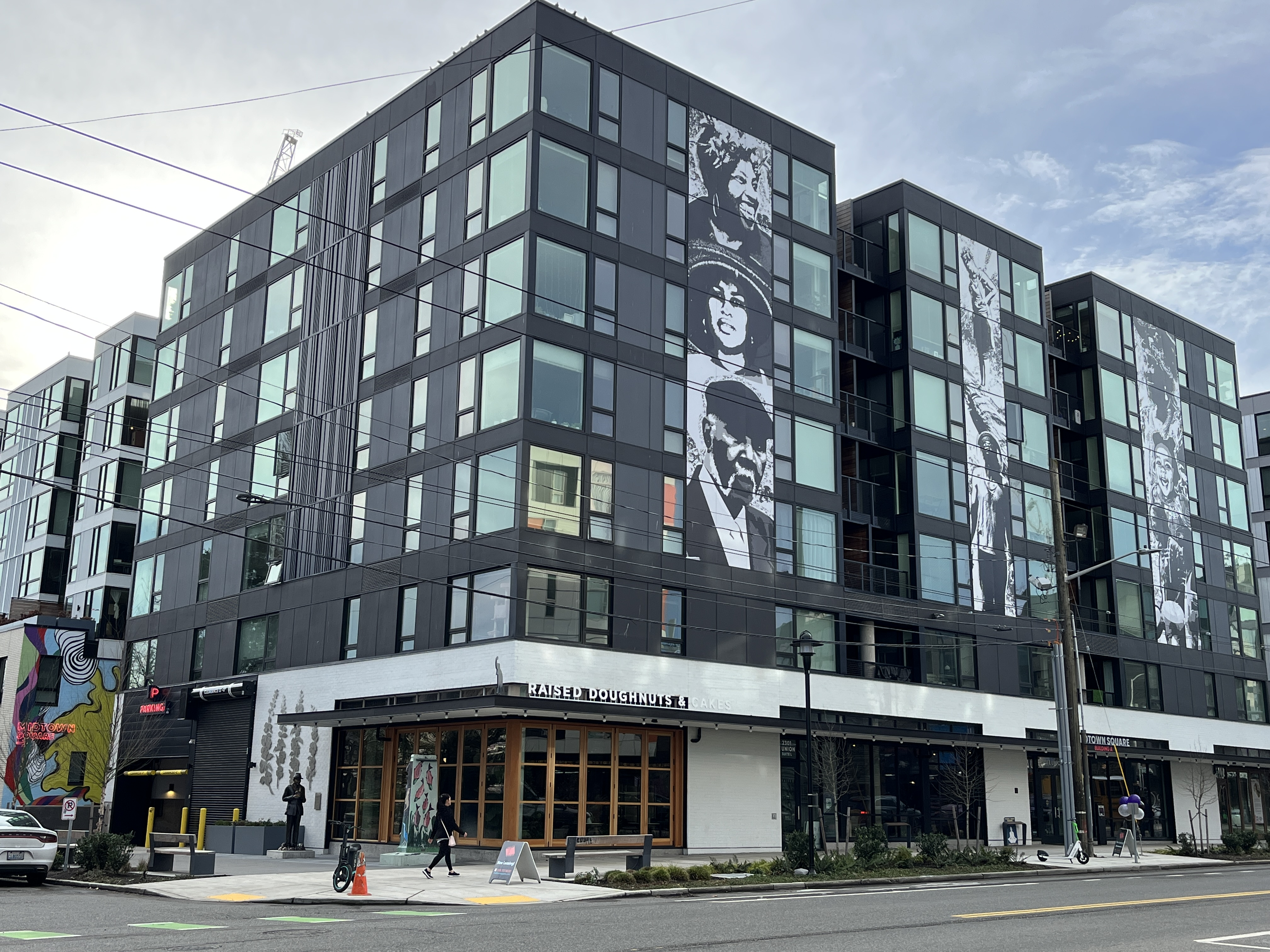
Raised Doughnuts in the Midtown Square complex, 2023

Baker and owner Mi Kim started Raised as a pop-up restaurant in 2017, after developing the concept since 2016; local entrepreneur and restaurateur I-Miun Liu has been credited as her business partner. According to Brian Amick of Bake Magazine, "Mi Kim's goal is to bring back the memory of gas station doughnuts. Her father used to buy her gas station doughnuts every morning, and now she wants others to feel that same level of happiness."

In June 2018, the business opened an approximately 1,800 square foot shop in Seattle's Central District.

Kim hosted doughnut-making classes once per month, as of 2019. She expanded the business to offer cakes in 2019. Plans to relocate to the Midtown Square complex were announced in 2021.

In 2023, the business sold rabbit-shaped brown sugar shortbread cookies for Lunar New Year.

== Reception ==
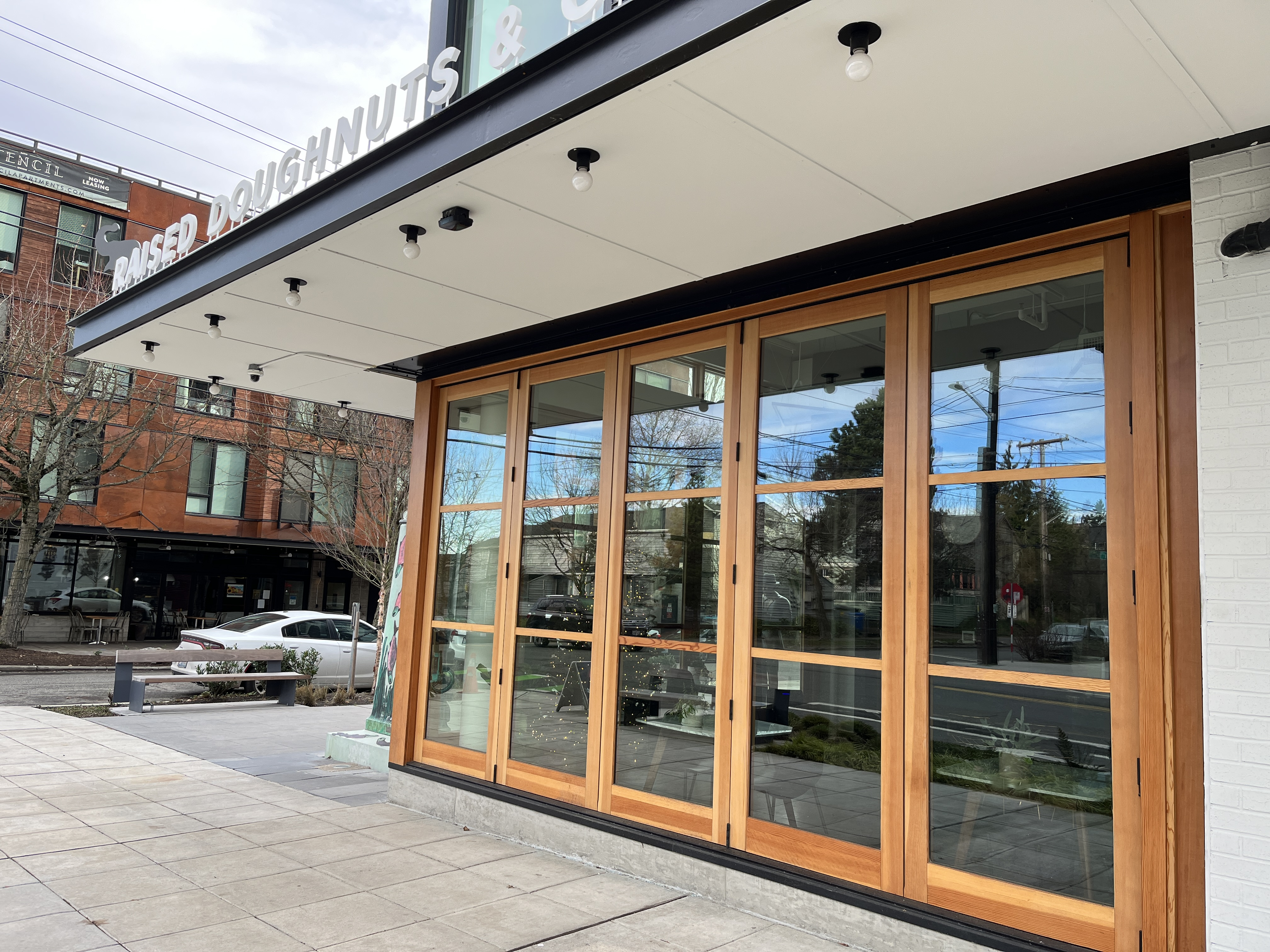
The shop's exterior in 2023

Raised was nominated for Bakery of the Year by Eater Seattle. The business was included in Alana Al-Hatlani's 2021 list of 12 "places to get some stellar cake slices in the Seattle area", and Megan Hill and Jade Yamazaki Stewart's 2022 list of 15 "great places to eat" in the Central District.

Callie Craighead included Raised in the Seattle Post-Intelligencer's 2021 list of Seattle's nine best doughnut shops. Abby Luschei included Raised in Seattle Refined's 2021 overview of the seven best doughnut places in the Seattle metropolitan area. Allecia Vermillion included the business in Seattle Metropolitan's 2022 list of the city's best doughnuts.

== See also ==
- List of bakeries
- List of doughnut shops
