= Maple bacon donut =

Dessert food

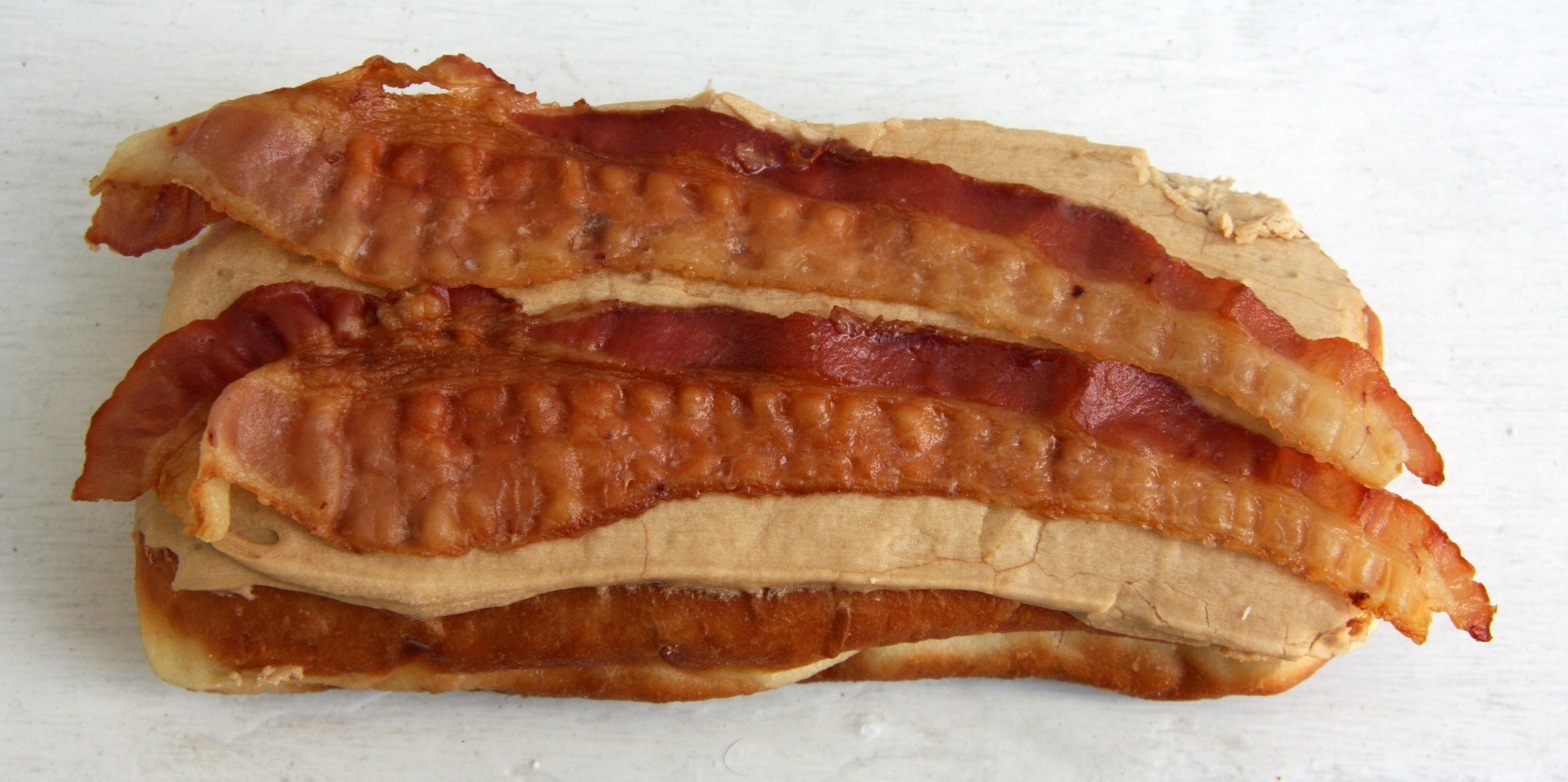
- Type: Doughnut
- Place of origin: United States
- Main ingredients: Dough, bacon, maple syrup

The maple bacon donut also spelled doughnut is a breakfast or dessert food that has become popular in some areas of the United States and Canada. It is distinct from other donuts because of the prominent bacon and maple syrup–flavored glaze used for toppings and has been discussed in the media as part of the phenomenon sometimes referred to as bacon mania. The bacon donut has been described as tasting like a "camping breakfast" (Pancakes with maple syrup, breakfast sausage links, and strips of bacon) all in one convenient item.

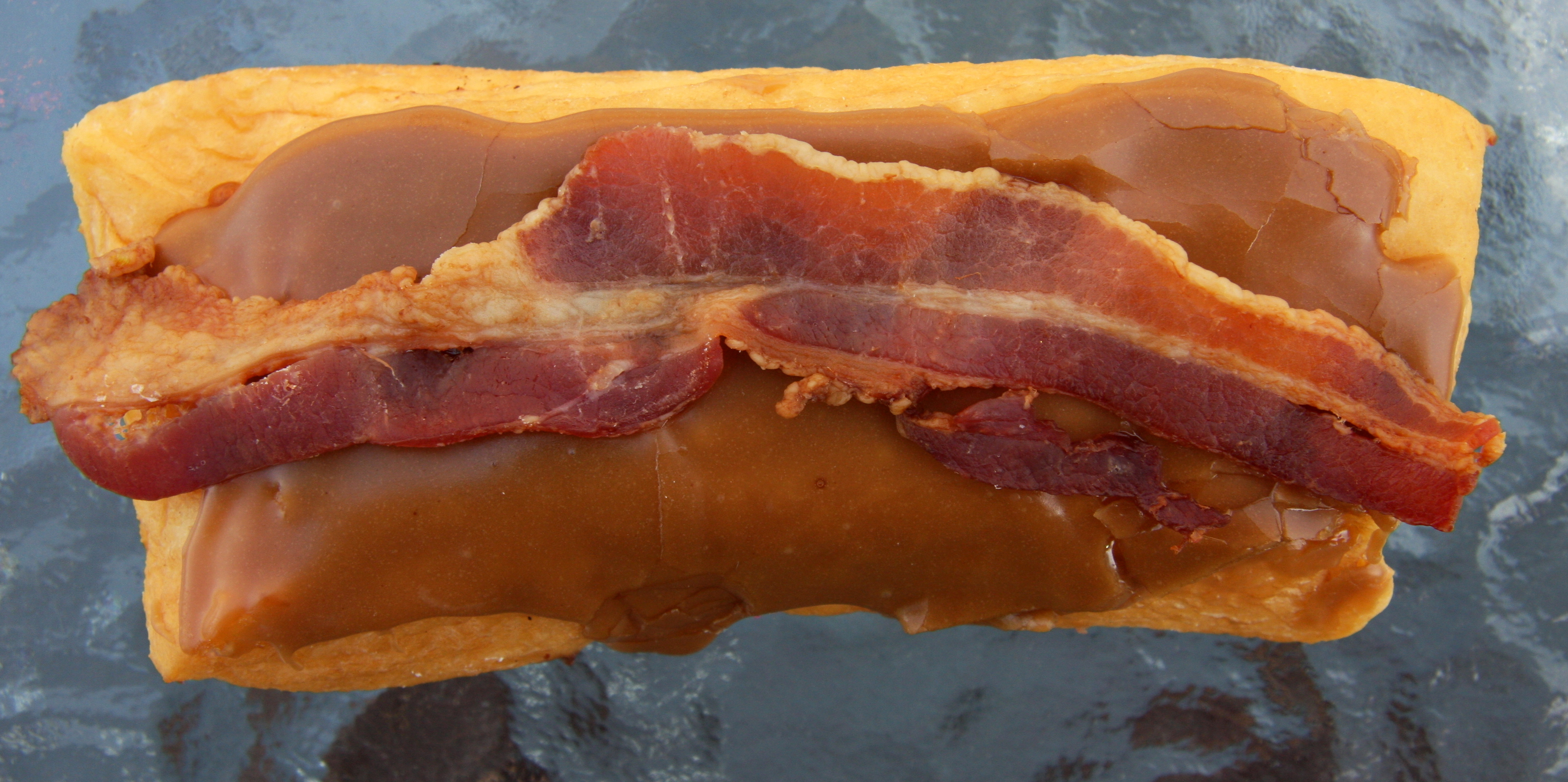
A bacon maple long john from Doomsday Donuts in Ripon, Wisconsin

== See also ==
- Maple bar
- Luther Burger
- List of foods made from maple
- List of doughnut varieties
- List of breakfast foods
