= Maple liqueur =

Alcoholic maple syrup product

- Type: Alcoholic beverage
- Place of origin: Canada and United States
- Main ingredients: Maple syrup

Maple liqueur refers to various alcoholic products made from maple syrup, primarily in the Northeast United States and Canada. It is most commonly made by mixing Canadian rye whiskey and Canadian maple syrup. Maple liqueur is considered an important cultural beverage in certain Canadian festivals.

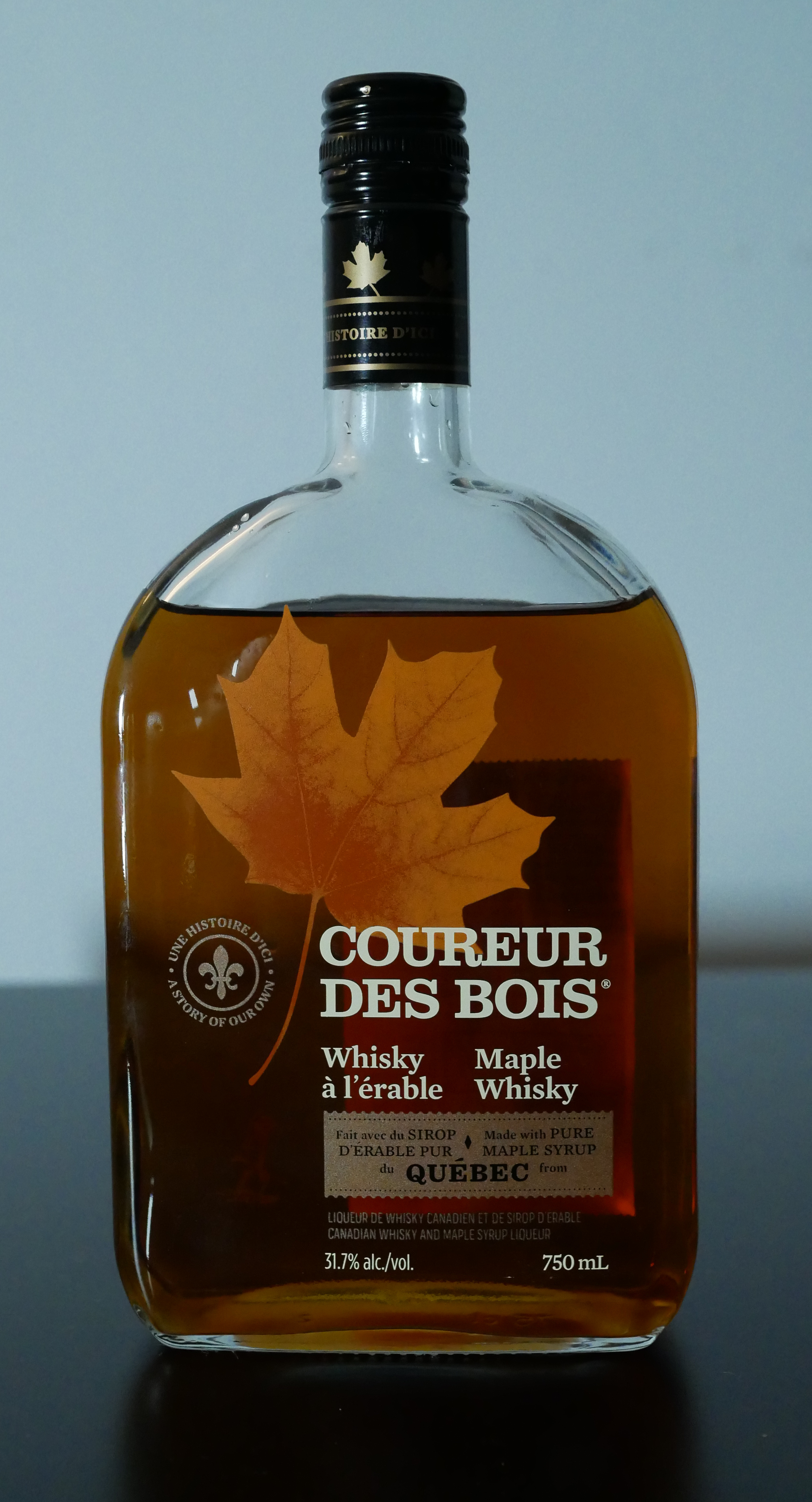
Coureur des bois, a commercial maple liqueur

In Canadian French, such a product is known as eau de vie d'érable.

== History ==
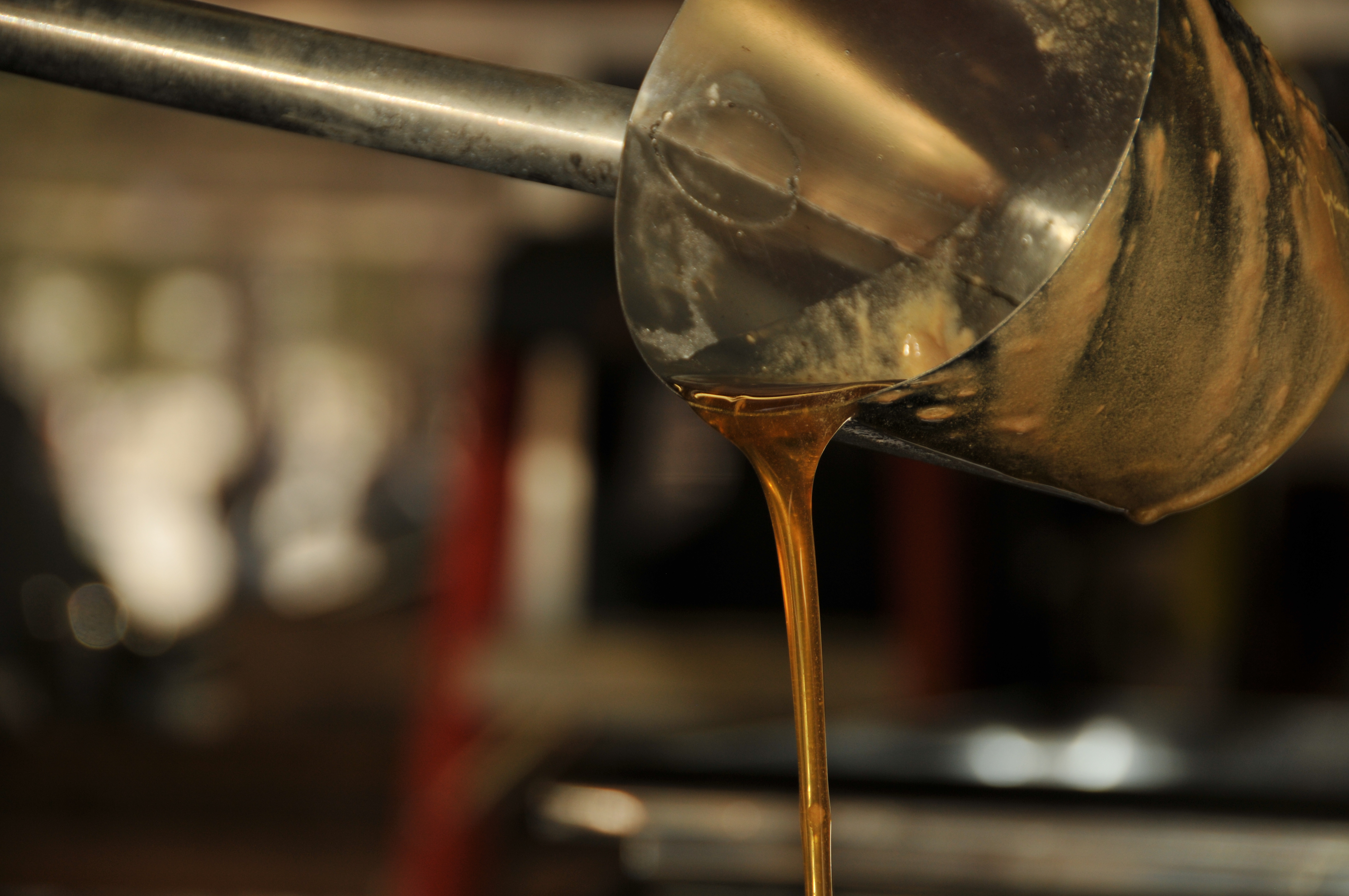
Maple Syrup Production

Maple liqueur is considered a traditional part of Canadian cuisine, in part because it contains Canadian whisky and Canadian maple syrup. Both of these components have their own unique history in Canadian cuisine. Notably, maple syrup has also been used in maple sap beer in areas such as Vermont. The process of mixing alcohol with maple syrup has been practiced traditionally in Canada for an extended period of time, and distilleries make their maple liqueur with these same processes.

=== Canadian maple syrup ===
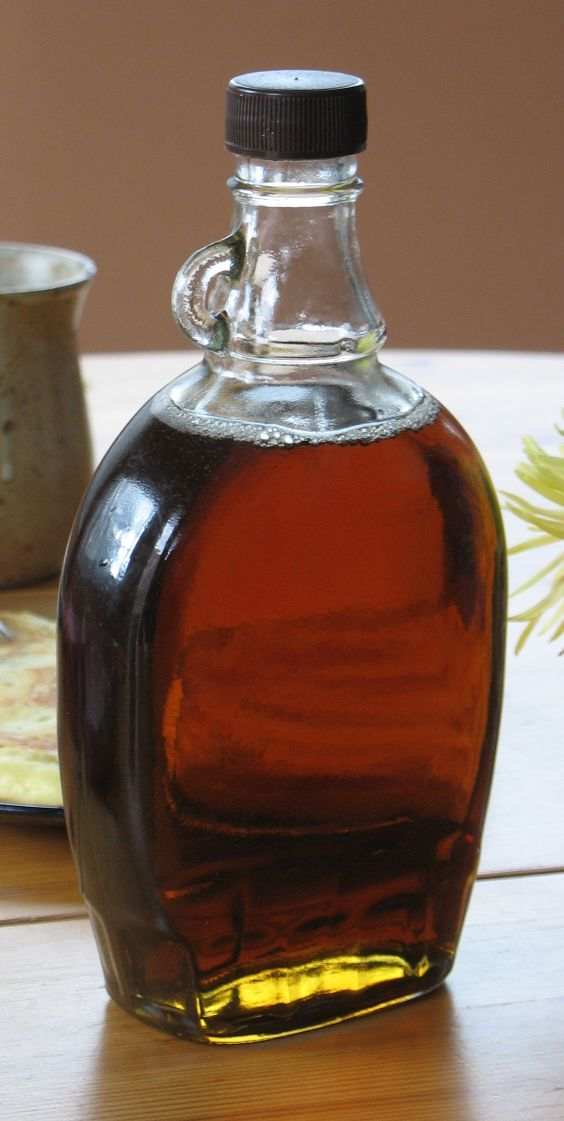
Maple syrup

First Nations people in North America produced maple syrup long before Europeans arrived in Canada. First Nations people would collect maple sap in the process of curing meat. Canadian settlers later learned the practice of sap collection and boiled the sap to produce maple syrup. Often, settlers would bore taps into the trees and place a collection bucket underneath them to collect sap. The maple leaf is on the Canadian flag and is a symbol of Canadian culture. Agriculture Canada also states that maple syrup continues to be introduced into liqueur blends. Modern collecting methods use tubing, connecting multiple maple trees together. The sap is then collected in a storage tank and evaporated using an evaporator. The basic process has not changed, although modern equipment and methods as stated before are now used. In total, Canada produces 71% of the world's pure maple syrup, and 91% of that is produced primarily in Quebec.

=== Canadian whisky ===
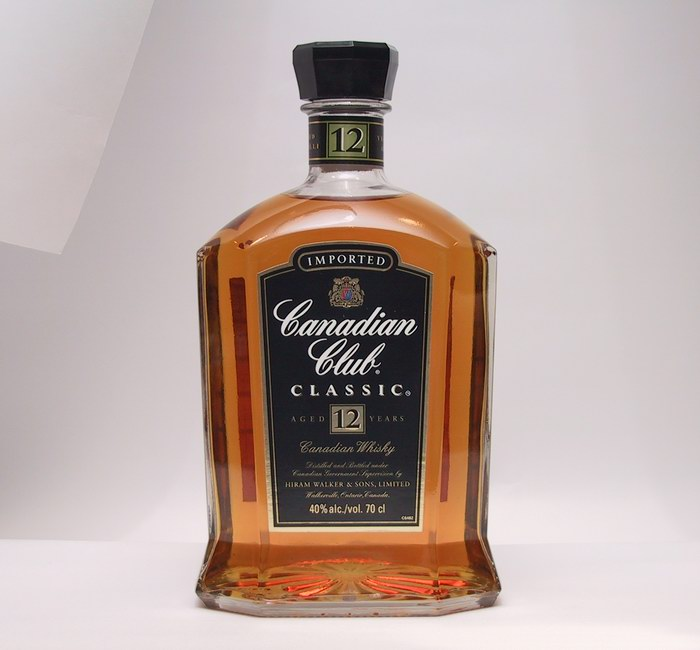
Aged Canadian Whisky

Canadian whisky is described as a grain spirit that has been aged in charred oak barrels for at least three years. The practice originated with Scottish settlers, who brought it over from overseas. The primary ingredient is corn, but rye is important because it adds a distinctive flavor. Currently, many brands of Canadian whisky are available. Whisky tends to have an alcohol content of around 40%-50%, although this can be increased by means of distillation.

== Production ==
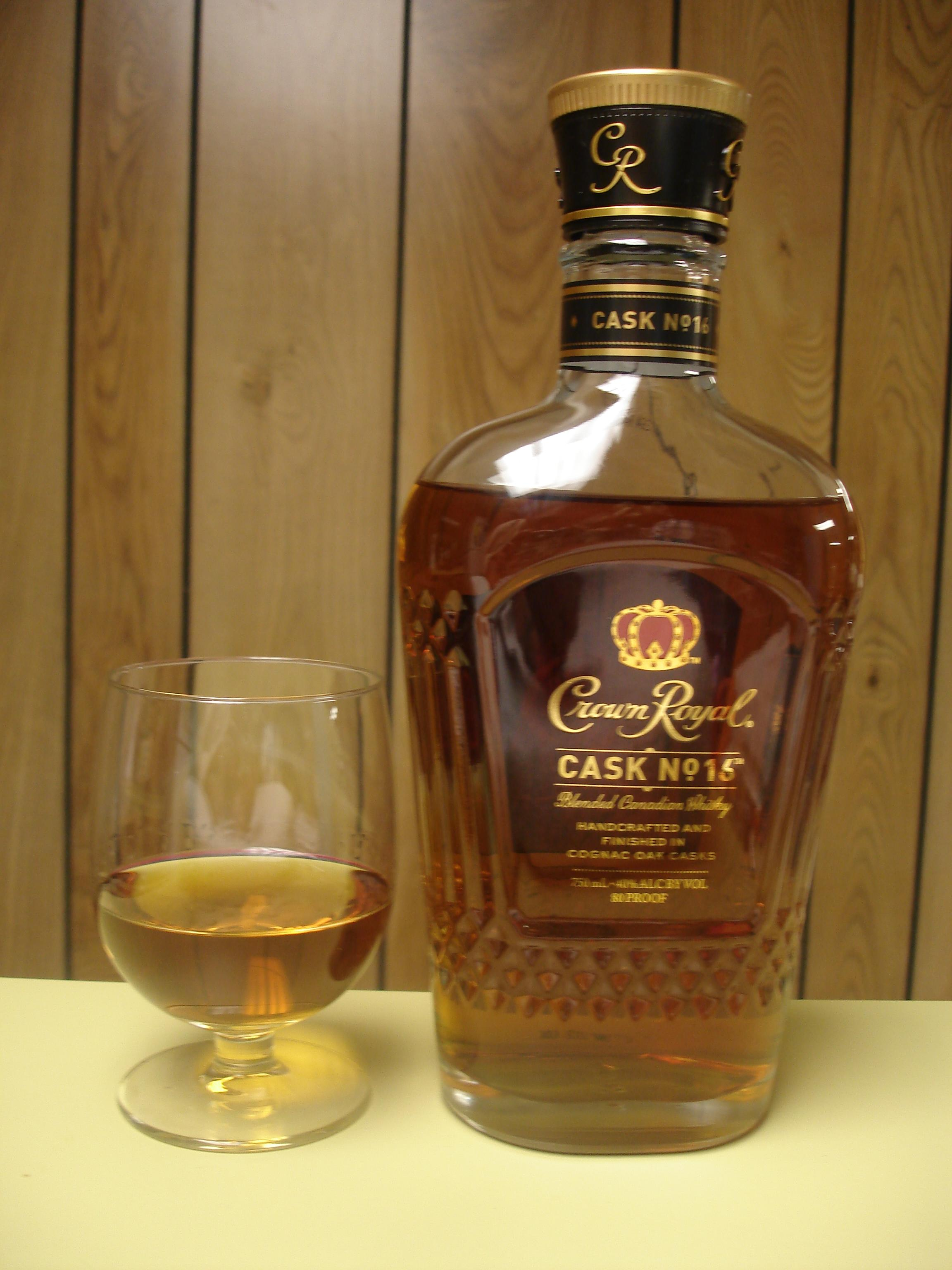
Crown Royal Cask No. 16 whiskey

Maple liqueur is not commonly found in liquor stores, as it is easy to make at home. The production process is simple and requires no special equipment. Homemade maple liqueur is both easy to make and inexpensive. It can be enjoyed on its own, in coffee, or in a variety of cocktails.

Ingredients needed are some liquor to use as a base, usually rye whiskey. The only other ingredient needed to make maple liqueur is pure maple syrup. Maple syrup comes in different grades, with the grade of a syrup determined by its colour, clarity, density, and intensity of maple flavour is. As the sap harvesting season progresses, the maple syrup that is produced becomes darker and more caramel in colour. These darker syrups also tend to have the most intense maple flavour, compared to the lighter taste of syrup produced early in the season. Darker syrups also create a more intense maple flavour in the liqueur and are often preferred when producing maple liqueur. The darker the syrup used, the more intense and full-bodied the resulting liqueur will taste.

Making maple liqueur is simple. A distilled spirit and maple syrup are combined. Other spices and ingredients can be added to give the liqueur different flavors, such as glycerin, honey, or brown sugar. As is with standard aging processes, generally, the longer the liqueur is left to age, the better the final product. After this, the liqueur is ready to be consumed.

As mentioned previously, commercially produced maple liqueurs are not very common because the liqueur is easy to make at home. They began to increase in popularity in the early 2010s, with Crown Royal, a popular whiskey brand, releasing its Crown Royal Maple Finished whiskey in 2013. Varieties other than whiskey also exist, with cream liqueurs being the second most common type. Examples such as Cabot Trail Maple Cream consist of pure maple syrup added to different combinations of rum, grain alcohols, and, in this case, fresh cream. Sortilège is another popular Canadian brand based in Montreal that produces three distinct varieties of maple liqueurs: Sortilège Whisky, Sortilège Prestige, and Sortilège Cream.

== Usage and consumption ==
As with all alcoholic beverages, maple liqueur can often be mixed with other beverages for cocktails, and also goes well in coffee.

=== Beverages ===
==== Canadian immigrant ====
This shooter consists of equal portions of Kahlúa, butterscotch liqueur, and maple liqueur. Usually, these ingredients are mixed in a large shooter glass, and then chased with warm maple syrup.

==== The waffler ====
This drink is a favorite at the Massachusetts College of Liberal Arts. Simply, a teaspoon of maple syrup is put in first, coating the sides of the glass. Then add maple liqueur and Bailey's Irish Cream to a shot glass at a 1.5:1 ratio. If done properly, Bailey's Irish Cream should form a layer on top, similar to other shooters, such as a buttery nipple.

==== Coffee ====
Coffee is often served in conjunction with Bailey's Irish Cream or Kahlua. As a more culturally Canadian practice, maple liqueur can be used instead to provide smooth sweet maple tones.

==== Maple cream ====
Also known as maple butter, maple cream is a dairy-free cream made by adding invertase to increase concentration. It is made of 1.5 oz. Maple liqueur and 1 oz. Vanilla Vodka, 4 oz. Vanilla ice cream, 1 scoop of ice, and a dash of maple syrup. The ingredients are evaporated, quickly cooled, stirred, and then packaged at room temperature. The process concentrates the ingredients, producing a light-colored cream with a smooth, creamy texture. Some common uses include spreading on toast, bagels, muffins, pancakes, doughnuts, and other baked goods.

==== Negus ====
This is a warm cocktail made with 3 shots of Port, 1 shot of lemon juice, and 1 shot of Sugar Maple Liqueur, topped with hot water. Garnish with Nutmeg, dust, and drink in a Toddy Glass.

==== Maple cream ale ====
This variant is favoured by Canadians for its refreshing peppermint flavour. It is made of 1.5 oz. Maple liqueur, 4 oz. Cream ale soda, ice, and is topped with a sprig of mint.

== See also ==
- List of foods made from maple
