= Oreilles de crisse =

Quebec dish (food)

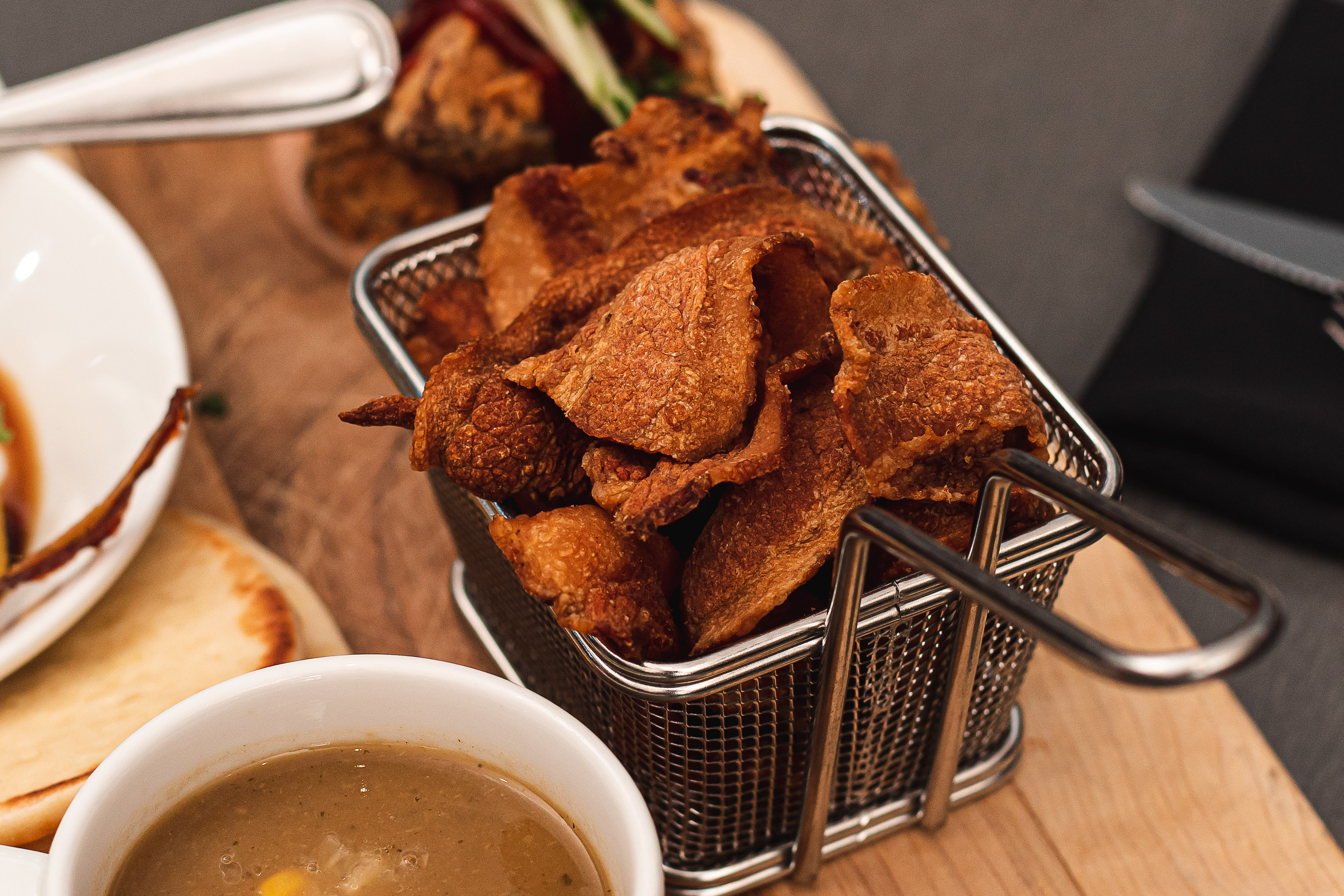
Oreilles de crisse

Oreilles de crisse (French pronunciation: [ɔʁɛj də kʁis]) is a traditional Quebec dish consisting of deep-fried salted fatback (pork rinds). Its name means "ears of Christ" and it is generally served in cabanes à sucre (sugar shacks) in spring time, as a salty and crunchy side contrasting with maple syrup-laden foods.

== See also ==
- Chicharrón
- Pork rinds
- List of deep fried foods
- List of smoked foods
