= Sugar bush =

Forest stand which is utilized for maple syrup

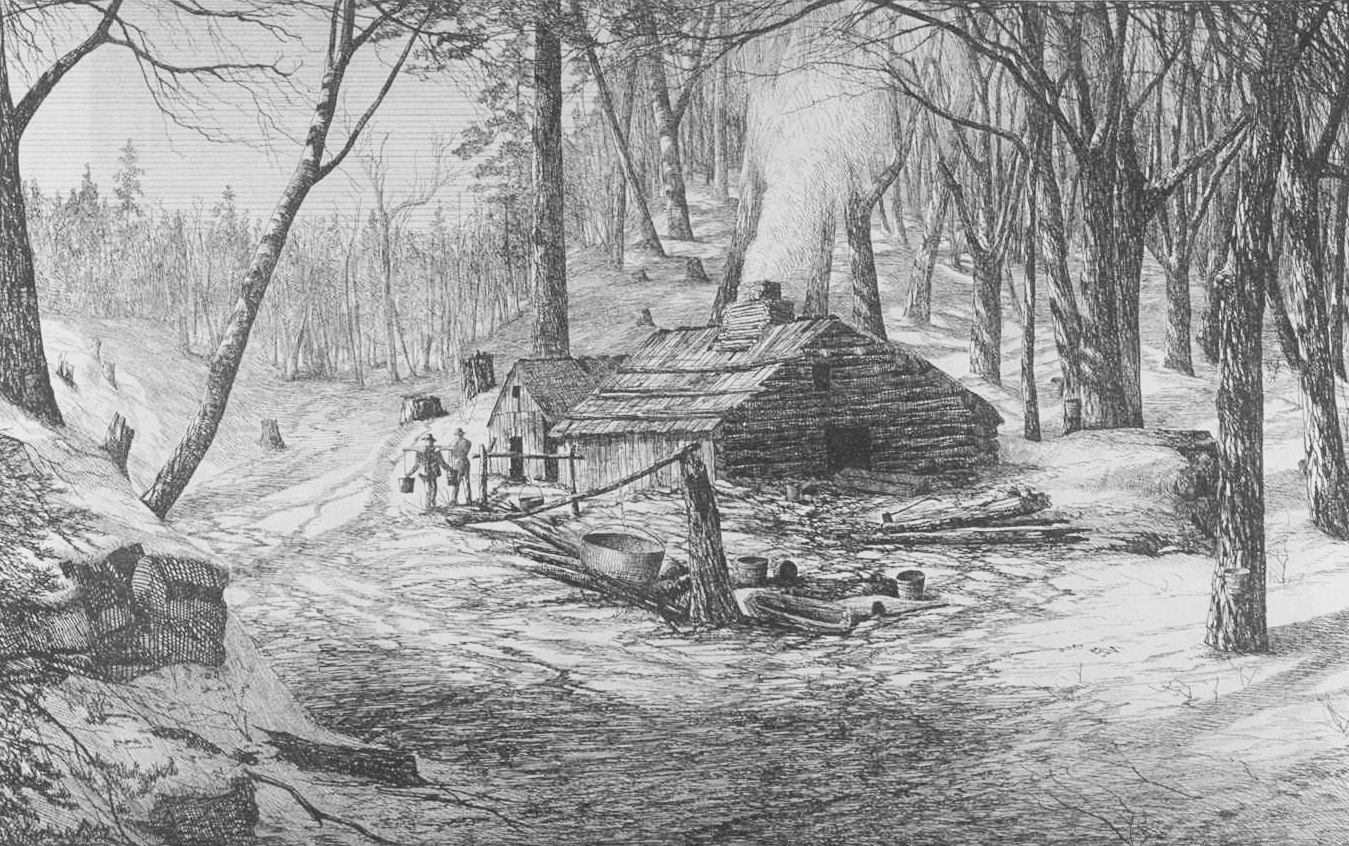
A sugar shack among the trees of a sugar bush (1872)

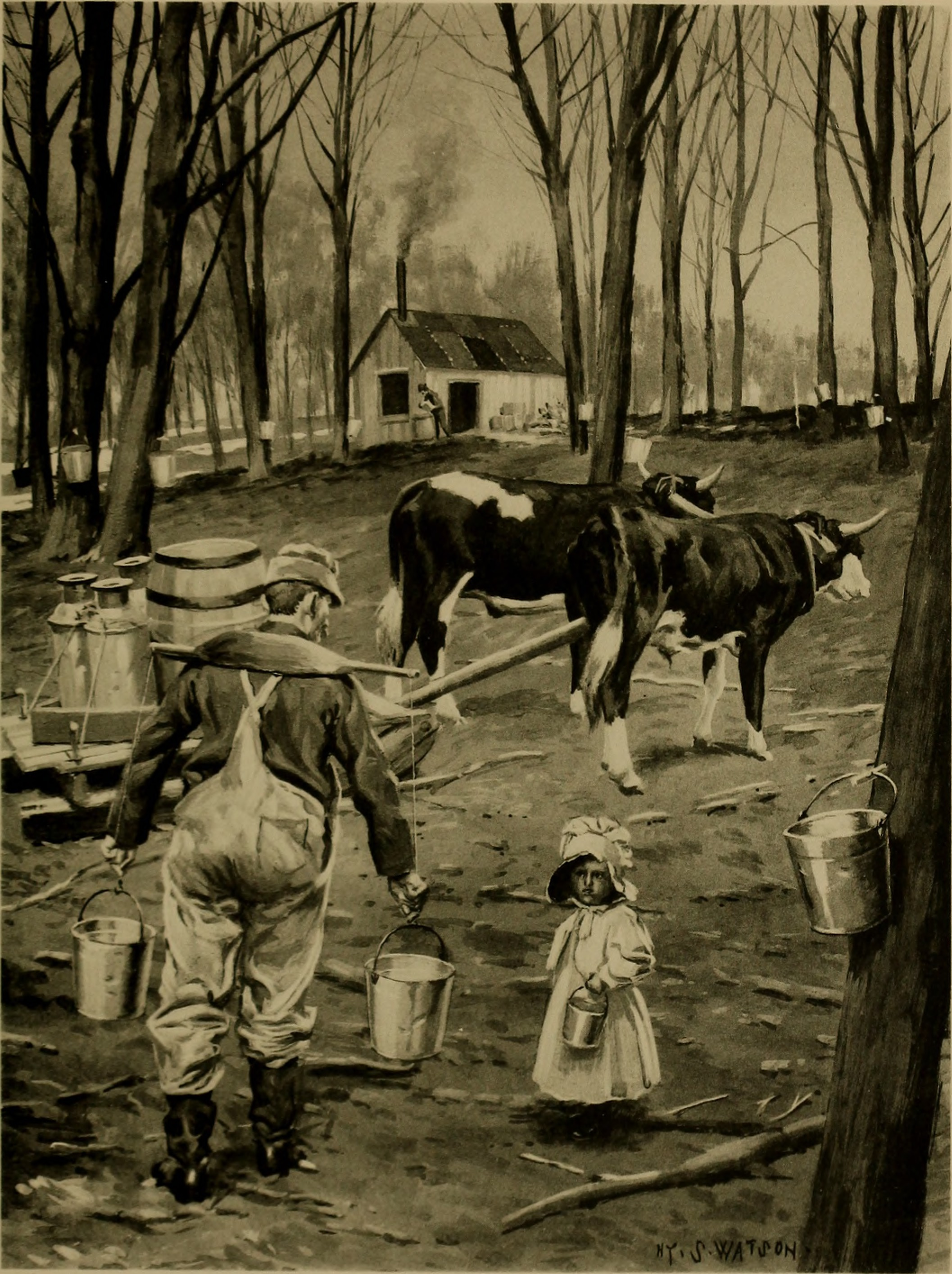
After tapping (c. 1902)

Sugar bush refers to a forest stand of maple trees, scientifically known as Acer saccharum, which is utilized for maple syrup. This was originally an Indigenous camp set up for several weeks each spring, beginning when the ice began to melt and ending when the tree buds began to open. At a traditional sugarbush, all the trees were hand tapped and the sap was boiled over wood fires. The Anishinaabe (Ojibwe) peoples have been doing sugarbush for generations and consider the process both a part of food and of medicine.

The tree canopy is dominated by sugar maple or black maple. Other tree species, if present, form only a small fraction of the total tree cover. In the Canadian provinces of New Brunswick, Ontario, Quebec and Nova Scotia, as well as New England and the Upper Midwest, many sugar bushes have a sugar shack where maple syrup can be bought or sampled.

The maples are tapped for their maple sap in early spring, whenever the weather has warmed so that day-time temperatures are above freezing – 0 °C (32 °F) – while night-time temperatures remain below freezing. The tapping period ends when the supply of maple sap ceases, as when night-time temperatures begin to be above freezing, or when the tree produces metabolites to facilitate tree bud development (which will give syrup an off flavor)—whichever comes first. After the tapping period, some maple sugar bushes experience a profusion of spring wildflowers which take advantage of unobstructed sunlight before the maple leaves emerge. In summer, a healthy maple sugar bush is luxuriant and shady. Autumn leaves are colourful, especially on the sugar maples.

== See also ==
- Sugarbush Hill
