= Jaan Paan Liqueur =

Jaan Paan Liqueur is a sweet paan-flavoured spirit/liqueur. It is made with neutral grain spirit, Canadian maple syrup and a blend of herbs and spices, excluding areca nut.

It is produced and bottled in Toronto, Ontario, Canada. Jaan has an alcohol content of 25% (alc/vol) (50 proof) and in 2011 the Spirits International Prestige Awards gave it a Platinum Medal.

== See also ==
- List of foods made from maple
