= Sugar shack =

Cabin where sap from maple trees is boiled into maple syrup

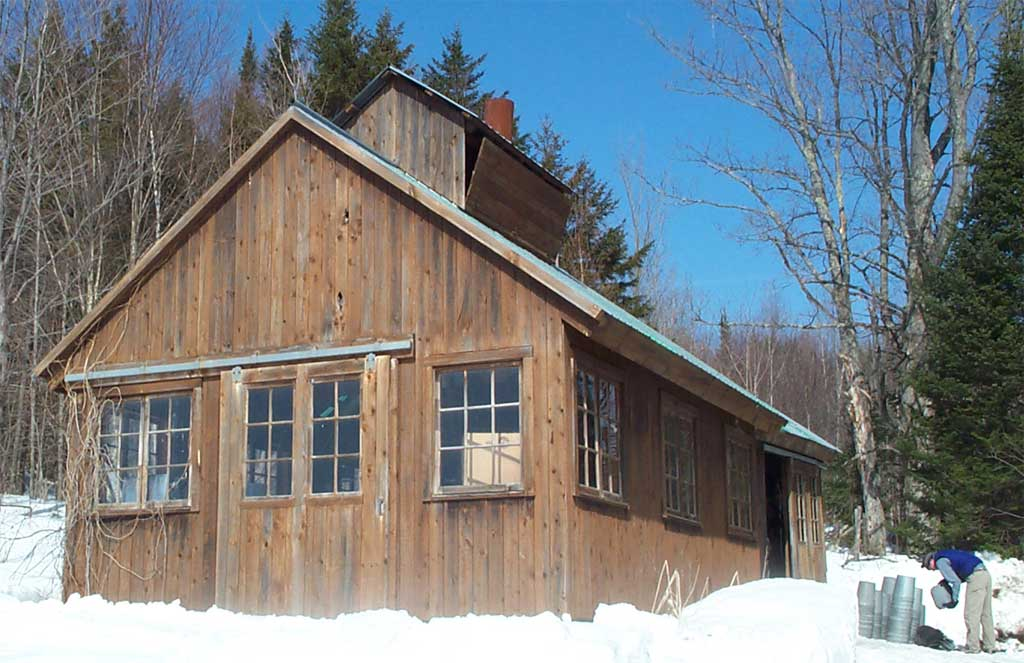
A sugar shack, where sap is boiled down to maple syrup in 2003

A sugar shack (French: cabane à sucre), also known as sap house, sugar house, sugar shanty or sugar cabin is an establishment, primarily found in Eastern Canada, northern New England, and the Great Lakes region. Sugar shacks are small cabins or groups of cabins where sap collected from maple trees is boiled into maple syrup. They are often found on the same territory as the sugar bush, which is intended for cultivation and production of maple syrup by way of craftsmanship (as opposed to global mass production factories built for that purpose in the 20th century).

== Syrup production ==
Historically, sugar shacks were developed through a combination of Native American and European innovations. French explorer and colonist Pierre Boucher described observing indigenous peoples making maple sugar in 1664. Maple sugar fabrication was introduced to New France by settlers of Swiss and Norman French origin during the 17th century. Their goal was the production of syrup for trade or sale, and for personal use during the cold winter months. After the British conquest of 1763, the practice spread to the provinces of Ontario, New Brunswick and Nova Scotia, but remained a primarily family-related cottage industry in Quebec.

== Food and recreational services ==
Today many sugar shacks are commercially operated. Some offer reception halls and outdoor activities, open to the general public during certain months. Some of these activities include sleigh-riding, tours of the grounds, and eating maple toffee made in the house, often in front of the customers. The reception halls often cater to large groups, offering dishes complemented by maple syrup such as ham, bacon, sausages, baked beans, scrambled eggs, pork rinds (including oreilles de crisse) and pancakes. Other specialities include pickles and bread, followed by desserts such as sugar cream pie and maple taffy on the snow.

The busier period for sugar shacks is from March to the end of April, which is when maple sap becomes available. However, at temperatures below 0 degrees Celsius, it is almost impossible to extract the sap, and therefore collection efforts are focussed in the thawing period of early spring. The ideal time is when temperatures drop below freezing at night and rise above freezing during the day. Sap collection is usually performed during the two first weeks of April, which has become the focus of an annual spring celebration.
