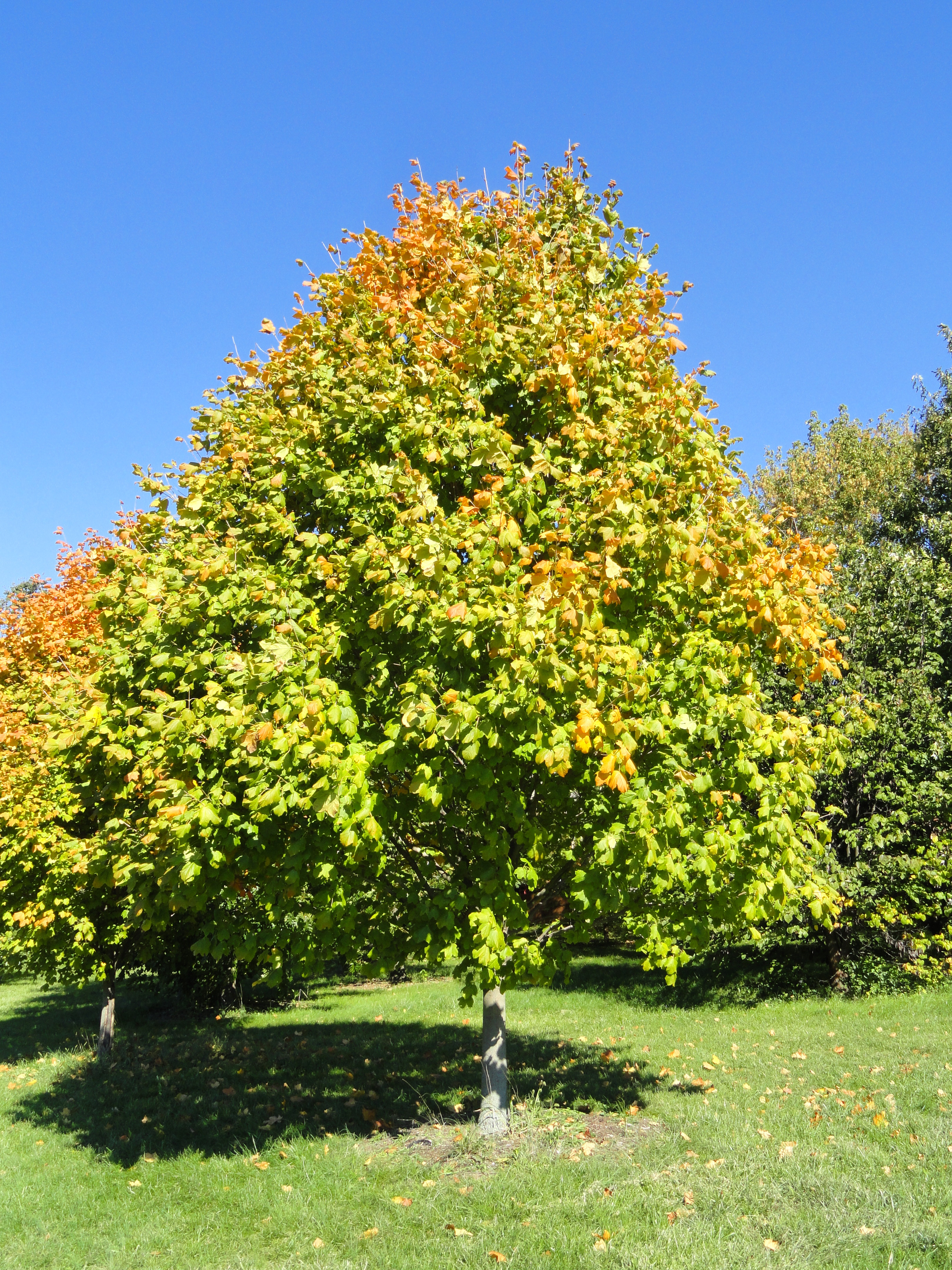

Conservation status
- Least Concern (IUCN 3.1)

- Secure (NatureServe)

Scientific classification
- Kingdom: Plantae
- Clade: Embryophytes
- Clade: Tracheophytes
- Clade: Spermatophytes
- Clade: Angiosperms
- Clade: Eudicots
- Clade: Rosids
- Order: Sapindales
- Family: Sapindaceae
- Genus: Acer
- Section: Acer sect. Acer
- Series: Acer ser. Saccharodendron
- Species: A. nigrum

Binomial name
- Acer nigrum F.Michx.
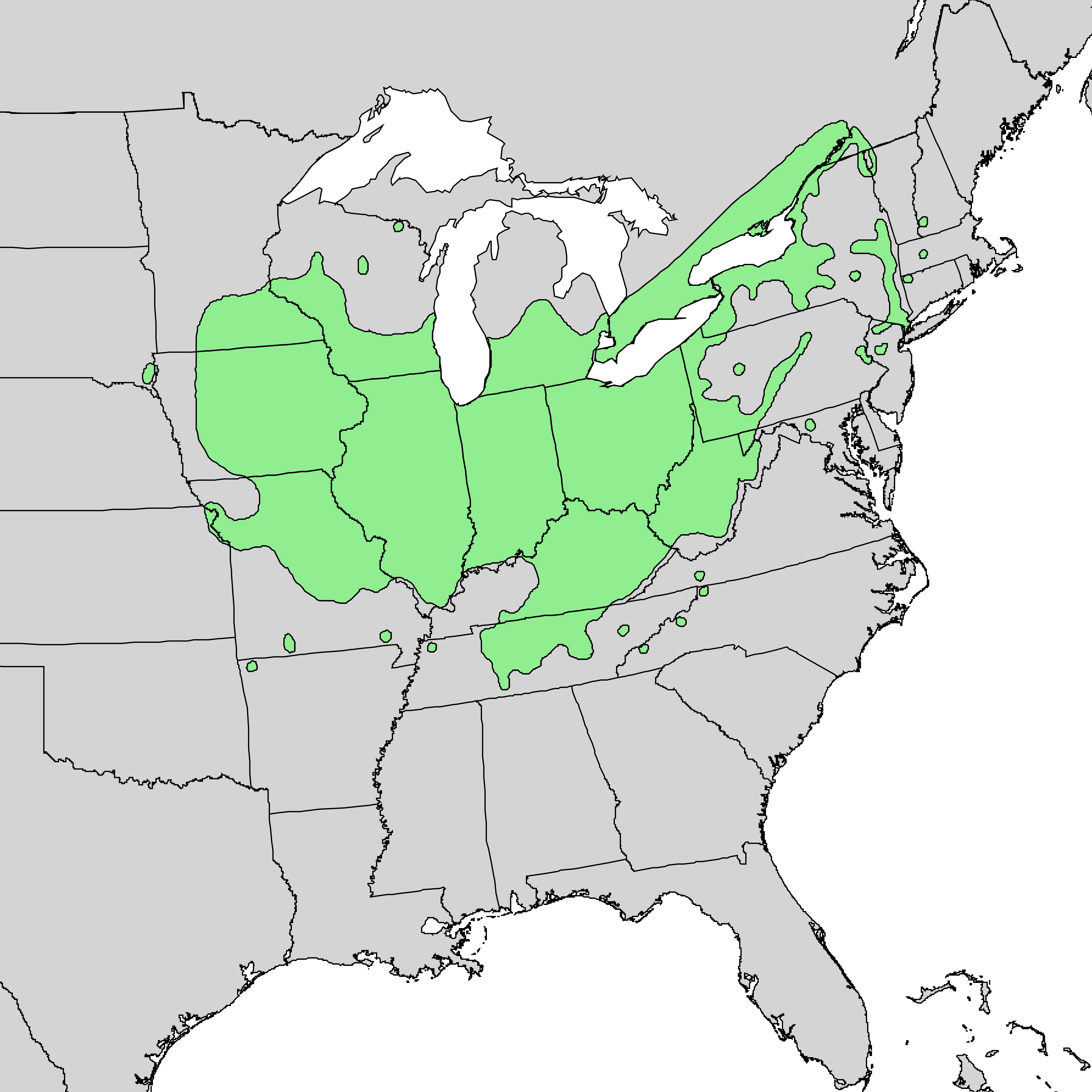
- Acer nigrum natural range

Synonyms
- Acer saccharum subsp. nigrum

= Acer nigrum =

Black maple

Species of flowering plant

Acer nigrum, the black maple, is a species of maple closely related to A. saccharum (sugar maple), and treated by some authors as a subspecies of it, as Acer saccharum subsp. nigrum.

Identification can be confusing due to the tendency of the two species to form hybrids. The simplest and most accurate method for distinguishing between the two trees is the generally three-lobed leaves of the black maple versus the generally five-lobed leaves of the sugar maple. The leaves of the black maple also tend to have a drooping appearance. Other differences that are not as pronounced include darker, more deeply grooved bark, slightly smaller seeds, a downy underside, and thicker petioles. Hybrids are intermediate in their characteristics.

== Distribution ==
The geographic range of A. nigrum is slightly more limited than the sugar maple, encompassing much of the Midwestern United States, portions of the Eastern United States, and the southeast of Canada in southern Ontario.

== Description ==
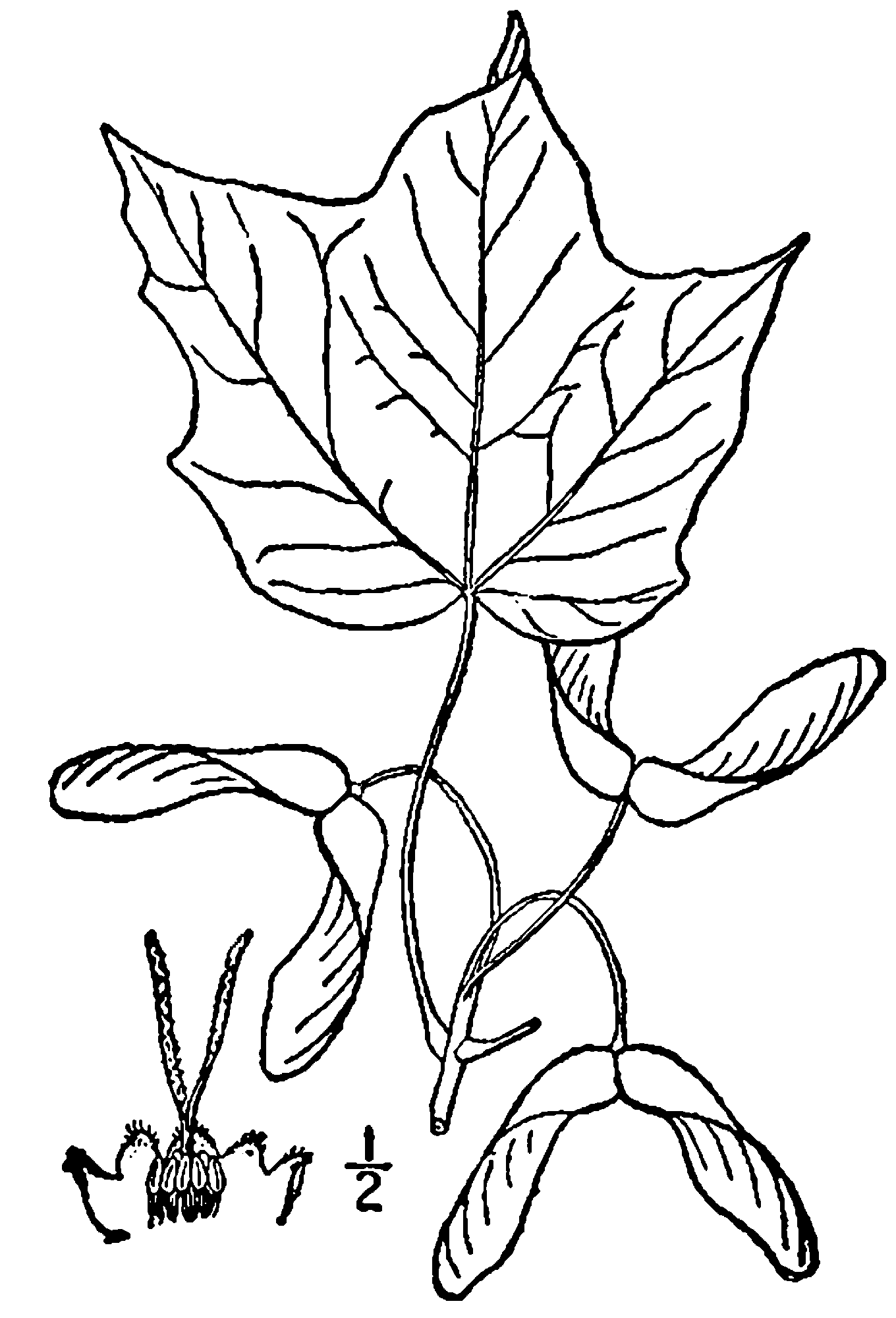
Illustration from 1913's Illustrated flora of the northern states and Canada

The black maple's mature height ranges from 21 to 34 meters (69 to 112 ft).

== Uses ==
This species is used similarly to the A. saccharum, for timber as hard maple, for landscaping, and for maple syrup production.

== See also ==
- List of foods made from maple
