= Long John (doughnut) =

American and Canadian pastry like a doughnut

Long John (pastry)
- Long John with maple frosting (maple bar doughnut)
- Alternative names: Cream stick, filled stick, chocolate bar, maple bar
- Type: Pastry
- Main ingredients: Dough, and glaze or icing
- Other information: May be called an "éclair", but has yeast-risen dough

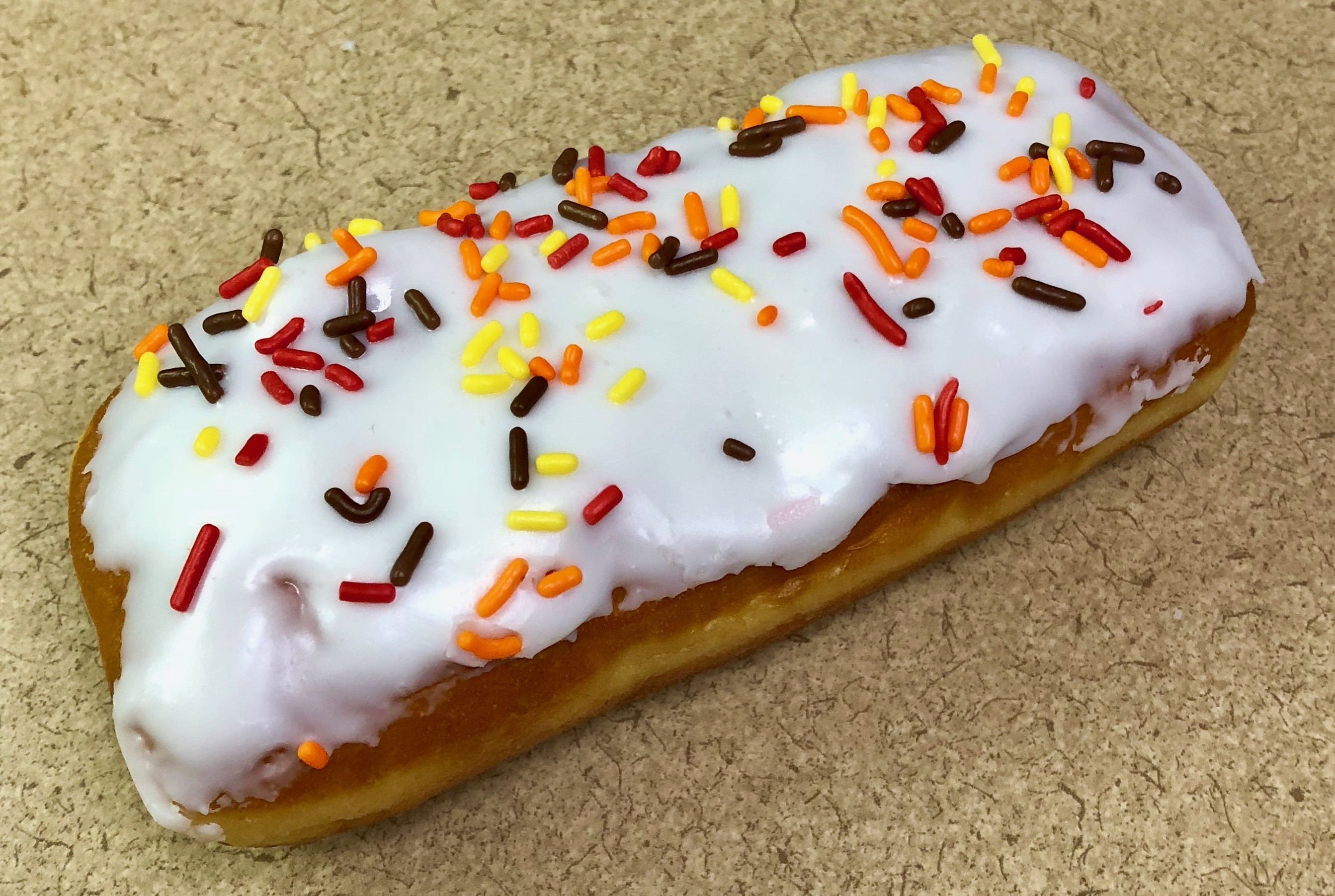
A Long John with sprinkles from Minnesota

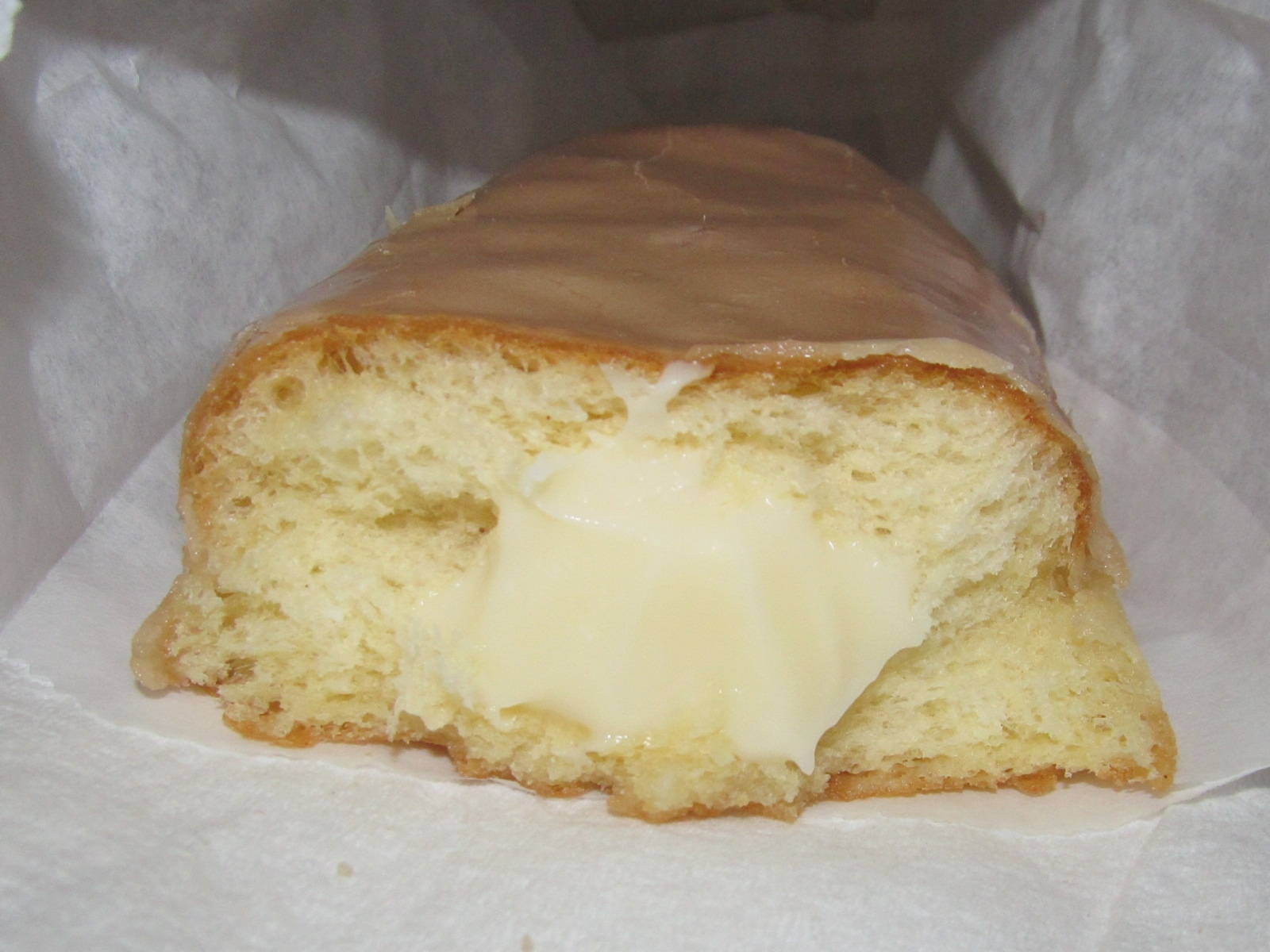
A cream-filled maple bar doughnut (filled with custard)

A Long John (also known as a bar, éclair, or finger doughnut) is a bar-shaped, yeast risen doughnut either coated entirely with glaze or top-coated with cake icing. They may be filled with custard or cream. Names for the doughnut are highly regional, with the term Long John used frequently in the Midwestern U.S., Canada, and Texas.

In other parts of the United States and Canada, such as the Mid-Atlantic and Central Canada, Long Johns are sometimes marketed as "éclairs"; the two pastries look similar but are created with different types of dough (steam-puffed vs. yeast-risen) and sometimes different fillings (the éclair may have chiboust cream). The éclair has (usually chocolate) fondant icing.

On the American West Coast Long Johns are called bars or bar doughnuts, such as the maple bar (topped with a maple glaze) and the chocolate bar. Filled Long Johns are called filled bars, or filled bar doughnuts. For example, an unfilled (or even custard-filled) Long John with maple-flavored icing is called a maple bar in California, Washington, and Oregon. They may also be topped with chopped bacon and called a maple bacon bar. Maple bars are prominent on the West coast of the United States; they are also known as a maple-glazed Long John, Maple-Creamstick or maple Bismarck.

Some parts of the American Midwest also call this type of pastry a finger doughnut or cream stick when filled.

== See also ==
- List of doughnut varieties
- List of breakfast foods
- List of foods made from maple
- Boston cream doughnut, the round cream filled donut, topped with chocolate
- Cruller, the German American rectangular donut with a twisted shape
- Éclair (pastry)
- Fritter, another doughnut-like pastry
