= Maple butter =

Confection made from maple syrup

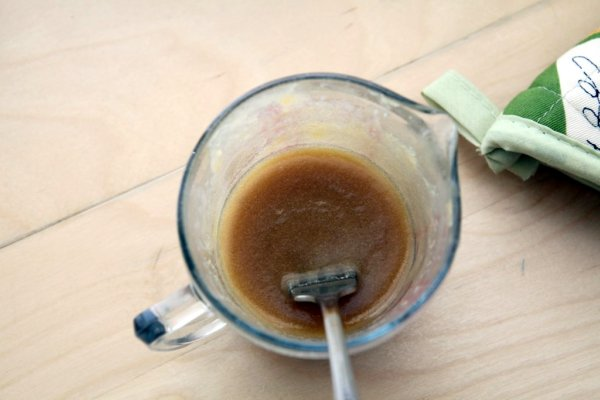
- Alternative names: maple spread
- Type: Spread
- Place of origin: Canada/Vermont
- Main ingredients: Maple syrup

Maple butter, also known as maple spread or maple cream, is a confection made from maple syrup, by heating the syrup to approximately 112 °C (234 °F), cooling it to around 52 °C (126 °F), and beating it until it reaches a smooth consistency. It is usually made from Grade A Light Amber syrup (sometimes known as Fancy), and is a light tan color.

The consistency of maple butter is light and spreadable, very similar to the consistency of peanut butter. Its name comes from the fact that it is "buttery" or "creamy" smooth, not because it contains any dairy product (it is dairy-free). It is sometimes used as a spread instead of butter, or as a frosting. Cinnamon is sometimes added to create "maple cinnamon butter".

Maple butter can also refer to blending maple syrup and butter, a typical recipe made of two parts butter to one part syrup.

== See also ==
- List of foods made from maple
- List of spreads
