= Being Canadian =

2015 Canadian documentary comedy

- Theatrical release poster
- Directed by: Robert Cohen
- Written by: Robert Cohen
- Produced by: Colin Keith Gray; Megan Raney Aarons
- Cinematography: Megan Raney Aarons
- Edited by: Becky Hunter
- Music by: Craig Northey; Scott Hard
- Distributed by: Entertainment One (Canada); Candy Factory Films (int'l)
- Release dates: 25 April 2015 (Hot Docs Film Festival); 26 April 2015 (Canada); 18 September 2015 (US)
- Running time: 89 minutes
- Country: Canada
- Language: English
- Budget: $195,000

Being Canadian is a 2015 Canadian documentary comedy film that was written and directed by Robert Cohen and produced by The Sibs (Colin Keith Gray and Megan Raney Aarons), in association with Movie Central and The Movie Network. The film is an examination of Canadian identity and is structured around a cross-country road trip. Cohen interviews Canadian celebrities, most of whom are comedians.

The film premiered in Canada at the Hot Docs Canadian International Documentary Festival in Toronto on 26 April 2015. Its American premiere in New York City on 18 September 2015 launched the Canada Cool film tour, which was sponsored by Telefilm Canada and the Museum of Modern Art (MOMA). Critical response to the film was mixed; while some critics said it is an entertainingly patriotic love letter to Canada, others said it fails to provide a fresh perspective or meaningful answers to the questions it asks. The Writers Guild of America nominated the film for a Best Documentary Screenplay award.

== Premise ==
Comedy writer Robert Cohen returns to Canada and sets out to find answers about Canadian identity, and the stereotypes and ignorance he encountered while living abroad. Cohen interviews several dozen Canadians and a few Americans, most of whom are comedians, posing questions he had frequently been asked. The interviews are interspersed with footage of a road trip in which Cohen travels across Canada after having spent most of his adult life working in the United States and aims to find answers and dispel misconceptions before arriving in Vancouver for Canada Day celebrations.

== Interviews ==
Cohen conducted over 100 interviews for the film. Unless otherwise indicated, the interviewees are comedians. He also conducted brief, on-the-street interviews with the public in Canada, the United States, the United Kingdom, Bangladesh, and India.

Canadians, in order of appearance:

- Dan Aykroyd
- Howie Mandel
- Rush:
  - Geddy Lee, musician
  - Neil Peart, musician
  - Alex Lifeson, musician
- Eugene Levy
- Will Arnett
- Caroline Rhea
- Morley Safer, journalist
- Seth Rogen
- Cobie Smulders
- Ann Luu, news anchor
- Tanya Memme, former Miss World Canada
- Martin Short
- Jason Priestley
- Catherine O'Hara
- Michael J. Fox
- Joel H. Cohen, sitcom writer
- Tim Long, sitcom writer
- Dan Signer, sitcom writer
- Chuck Tatham, sitcom writer
- George Stroumboulopoulos, TV host
- Alanis Morissette, singer-songwriter
- Kim Campbell, former prime minister
- Dave Foley
- Mike Myers
- David Steinberg
- Adrian Harewood, radio host
- Brigitte Gall
- Andrew Clark, professor
- Alan Thicke
- Alex Trebek, TV host
- Barenaked Ladies:
  - Steven Page, musician
  - Tyler Stewart, musician
  - Kevin Hearn, musician
  - Ed Robertson, musician
- Russell Peters
- Russell Keith Raney, rocket scientist
- Malcolm Gladwell, author
- The Trailer Park Boys (in character):
  - John Paul Tremblay as Julian
  - Robb Wells as Ricky LaFleur
  - Mike Smith as Bubbles
- Fearless Fred, radio host
- Paul Shaffer, musician
- Nathan Fillion
- William Shatner, actor
- Manisha Krishnan, journalist
- Linda Allan, etiquette expert
- Andrew Estabrooks, brewer
- Mike MacDonald
- Christy Morgan, Bonaparte Band, Secwepemc Nation
- Rich Little
- The Royal Canadian Air Farce
- Marc Thuet, chef
- Mary Bamford, nutritionist
- Paul Rouillard, Dep.Dir., Federation of Quebec Maple Syrup Producers
- Herbie Barnes
- Darrell Dennis
- Anton Leo, TV executive
- Mark Cohon, CFL commissioner
- Rick Mercer
- Susie Patricola, Cohen's mother
- Marsha Berniker, psychotherapist
- Helga Stephenson, then-CEO of the Academy of Canadian Cinema & Television

Americans, in order of appearance:

- Kathy Griffin
- Conan O'Brien
- Wayne Federman
- Ben Stiller
- Dana Gould

== Synopsis ==
The film opens with a brief mockumentary of Canadian Confederation, which filmmaker Robert Cohen says was met with indifference outside the country. Cohen then speaks about his childhood in Calgary, Alberta, and moving to Los Angeles, California, where he became a television sitcom writer. In his introduction, Cohen calls Being Canadian an attempt, through interviews with Canadians and foreigners while completing a cross-country road trip from 22 June to 1 July 2013, to explore the frustrating ignorance and stereotypes he encountered while living in the US.

Outsider perceptions of Canada are illustrated with interviews and anecdotal evidence, such as the idea all Canadians live in igloos in a barren landscape. Numerous Canadians who have worked in the US entertainment industry note their nationality was met with confusion or suspicion, which is likened to McCarthy-era paranoia of the invisible outsider.

Canadian politeness and propensity to apologize is noted as a true positive stereotype, a reputation as good people that leads to better social treatment abroad – particularly in comparison to Americans. Some interviewees note Canadians are "slaves to their courtesy", a statement that is followed by a montage of apologies. Some, however, perceive this as passive-aggressiveness.

Maple syrup is noted for its close connection with Canadian cuisine, and its association with the maple leaf as a national symbol and the Great Canadian Maple Syrup Heist, one of the country's largest crimes. Discussion of Canadian sports includes the respect observed in hockey fights and the Canadian Football League's 1951 and 1976 championships, in which the competing teams had homophonic names.

Crossing into Ontario, the weather suddenly changes and Canadians are shown taking this in their stride with ice skating, art displays, and fishing on the frozen Rideau Canal in Ottawa. (Note: In one of the film's more blatant parodies of misconceptions about Canada, Ottawa is shown to be frozen-over in June (when average low temperatures are about 11 °C [52 °F] and the record low is 3.5 °C [38.3 °F]). Scenes of the Winterlude festival on the 7.8-kilometre (4.8 mi) Rideau Canal Skateway are depicted as normal, everyday, summertime activities in Canadian cities.) Survival in the Canadian climate is discussed in the context of pioneer and modern times, with fatalistic humour raised as a coping mechanism. Noting the many Canadian comedians, Canadian humour is discussed. Canada's juxtaposition between the dominant British and American cultures is said to provide an outsider perspective for observational humour, satire and parody, with self-deprecating underdog characters and likeable troublemakers.

After stopping in Saskatchewan to watch a patriotic performance of Musical Ride, Cohen travels to Calgary, his hometown. Canadian television of his childhood is examined, noting the low production values and the two-decade run of The Beachcombers. Comparisons with US television leads into a discussion of Canada's love-hate relationship with the United States. Canada is likened to an attention-seeking younger brother and the interviewees note Canada is unlikely to receive any acknowledgement from its southern neighbour and does not enter into the thoughts of most Americans.

Canadians' inferiority complex is discussed along with many Canadians' need to create validating comparisons. Cohen visits a psychotherapist as Canada, a child of England and France with an awkward upbringing beside a noisy neighbour, and is told he cannot be happy defining himself with external comparisons. Cohen becomes depressed as he begins the final leg of his journey with no definitive answer about what it means to be Canadian.

While stopping due to a storm, Cohen's doubts about the project grow and he has a drunken vision of Wayne Gretzky, who tells Cohen to believe in Canada and persevere. He reaches Vancouver in time for Canada Day celebrations. While filming an enthusiastic and boisterous parade, Cohen realizes in his absence, Canada had grown into a confident, patriotic country that does not need to be defended by him or his film. With a renewed sense of pride, Cohen realizes there was no need for his insecurities, that modern-day Canada does not need outside recognition and that he can carry that identity with him.

== Development and production ==
In 2008, Cohen started collecting interviews without a firm plan for the assembled documentary. (Note: One of Cohen's first interviews was with The Barenaked Ladies, before a concert in Los Angeles, prior to Steven Page's departure from the group in early 2009. Conan O'Brien's interview was conducted on the set of Late Night in February 2009 or earlier.) In 2011 at Toronto's Humber College, Cohen spoke about the factors that allow Canada to produce a large number of comedians. His research on this issue raised personal questions about Canadian identity and the rest of the world's apparent lack of interest in the country. Cohen was frustrated with perceptions of Canada and Canadians in the United States, (Note: While Cohen was on a family vacation in Hawaii, local shops offered free donuts to Canadians for their country's role in the Iran hostage crisis. Cohen and his brothers tried to take up a shop's offer but were refused as the owner thought Canadians wear furs and have blue skin with icicles hanging from their faces.) (Note: While moving to Los Angeles, Cohen was given a traffic ticket by a law enforcement officer who refused to acknowledge the existence of Alberta, as indicated on his licence plates, and wrote he was from "Atlantis".) and sought to dispel stereotypes and ignorance.

The documentary Sherman's March inspired Cohen for the film's structure, which follows a 10-day road trip from Peggy's Cove, Nova Scotia, to Vancouver, British Columbia. Producers Colin Gray and Megan Raney Aarons (a.k.a. The Sibs) of Grainey Pictures said Cohen's project was "love at first sight" for them. It was executive-produced by Michael Souther, Teza Lawrence and Michael LaFetra for Amaze Film + Television.

Cohen had difficulty obtaining interviews with high-profile figures until he contacted friends Foley and Myers. The project then quickly built momentum as an increasing number of celebrities sought to be included. Cohen stated Americans Griffin, O'Brien and Stiller were fascinated by the subject and wanted to be part of it when they learned of the Canadian celebrities who were participating. Distributor Entertainment One was attracted to the project on the strength of media attention from the celebrity interviews. Cohen then found months of editing were required to reduce 120 hours of interviews into a finished, 89-minute film. Some material that was not used in the film was provided to promotional sponsors and video-on-demand (VOD) services as bonus footage.

== Financing ==
The core production team, who worked on deferred payment, initially self-financed Being Canadian. Funding from Telefilm Canada was uncertain because although the film was created by Canadians and is about being Canadian, the funding body questioned whether it was Canadian enough. This was because the Californian location of Grainey Pictures, the production company of Canadians Gray and Aarons, technically makes the film an American-Canada co-production. Telefilm later provided financing for the film.

The production conducted public fundraising on the crowdfunding website Indiegogo from 17 May 2013, raising $12,000 in the first fortnight towards a goal of $95,000.

== Release ==
Cohen had hoped to release Being Canadian at the September 2013 Toronto International Film Festival, two months after filming the cross-country road trip. The film instead premiered on 25 April 2015 at the Bloor Hot Docs Cinema as part of Toronto's Hot Docs international documentary festival. The film was screened in the Special Presentations programme of 17 premiering documentaries, recent award-winners and works by veteran documentarians. The following day, Being Canadian was released through video-on-demand (VOD) services in Canada. Because of the limited availability of screens, Entertainment One believed an immediate VOD release was the best way to make the film available while taking advantage of media coverage of its premiere. Promotional sponsors for the film included Tim Hortons, Air Canada, Molson Canadian, and Roots Canada.

Candy Factory Films acquired the American and worldwide distribution rights at the Hot Docs festival. The American release of Being Canadian was originally planned for 1 July – Canada Day. Instead, the film had its American theatrical premiere on 18 September 2015 at Cinema Village in New York City, launching Telefilm Canada's Canada Cool exhibition tour in partnership with the Museum of Modern Art (MoMA). (Note: The Canada Cool tour replaced the Canada Front showcase at the Museum of Modern Art.) On the same day, Being Canadian was released on VOD in the US.

Being Canadian had its television premiere on The Movie Network on 13 December 2015. The same year, the film toured several film festivals, including Nantucket Film Festival, DocFest Film Festival and Traverse City Film Festival.

== Reception ==
=== Critical response ===
Frank Scheck of The Hollywood Reporter wrote Being Canadian is a "hardly essential but diverting doc". He found it explores every cliché about Canada with amusing commentary by a large number of Canadian celebrities but does not provide satisfactory answers to the questions it raises. Will Sloan and Carly Maga of Torontoist gave the film two stars out of five, finding the celebrity interviews entertaining but calling it a shallow examination that acknowledges cultural quirks without finding answers, offering nothing new for a domestic audience. Michael Rechtshaffen of the LA Times found Being Canadian to be "more of a checklist than an in-depth analysis" and said the humour would be more understood by Canadian expats than indifferent Americans. David Berry of the National Post rated the film one out of four and wrote its jokes and observations are stale, outdated, and tied together with a sloppy narrative. Norman Wilner of Now Magazine called it "a pandering stunt" and said, through its attempts at humour, the film dismisses the interviewees' considered opinions on identity and cultural responsibility.

Laurence Kardish, curator emeritus of MoMA, said Being Canadian has "ambitious originality". Dan Snierson of Entertainment Weekly called it a "charming underdog film". Debra Yeo of the Toronto Star wrote the film could leave Canadian viewers full of "pride, or at least amusement". Liz Braun of The Toronto Sun wrote the interviews are the best part of Being Canadian, which has well-delivered humour in a condensed look at Canadian culture. Matthew Ritchie of Exclaim! wrote the comedy documentary is "a labour of love" full of silliness, and that its underlying message is "Canadians are funny people". Pat Mullen of Point of View Magazine called the film "unabashedly and amusingly patriotic" and a "fun, laid-back jaunt into our collective psyche" that is told in a manner in which even its omissions are distinctly Canadian. He compared it to Alan Zweig's 2013 documentary When Jews Were Funny because the interviewees laugh and joke at the absurdity of their common experiences. Mullen excuses the film's flaws in the art of relating a joke. Stephen Marche, writing for Esquire, took note of the invisible-outsider status of Canadians in the United States, which interviewed comedians say gives them a special edge. He found the film to be a true documentary-comedy, a journey in pursuit of a country's identity, landing on a joke. According to Marche; "Canadians make the best kind of foreigners. You can barely tell they're there. And when you do notice them, they just make you laugh." Peter Howell of the Toronto Star noted Cohen's "absurd and generous wit", and his ability to get his subjects to open up.

=== Award nomination ===
The Writers Guild of America nominated Being Canadian for Best Documentary Screenplay at their 68th annual awards in 2016.

== See also ==
- Great Canadian Maple Syrup Heist
- The Canadian Conspiracy
- When Jews Were Funny
