= Curmudgeon =

Curmudgeon may refer to:

- Dyskolos, sometimes translated The Curmudgeon, an ancient Greek comic play by Menander
- Curmudgeons (film), a 2016 short film
- Curmudgeon, B-side of Nirvana's Lithium single

== See also ==
- Curmudgeons Day (January 29)
- I, Curmudgeon, a 2004 documentary film by Alan Zweig
- The Comics Curmudgeon, blog analyzing newspaper comics
- I quatro rusteghi, sometimes translated The Four Curmudgeons, a comic opera
- Il burbero di buon cuore, sometimes translated The Good-Hearted Curmudgeon, an opera dramma giocoso
- Misanthropy
