= When Jews Were Funny =

2013 Canadian documentary film

- Directed by: Alan Zweig
- Written by: Alan Zweig
- Produced by: Jeff Glickman; Jesse D. Ikeman
- Production company: Sudden Storm Entertainment
- Distributed by: Kinosmith
- Release dates: 10 September 2013 (TIFF); 15 November 2013 (Canada)
- Running time: 89 minutes
- Country: Canada
- Languages: English; Yiddish

When Jews Were Funny is a 2013 Canadian documentary comedy film, directed by Alan Zweig. It was produced by Jesse Ikeman and Jeff Glickman for Sudden Storm Entertainment. The film features two dozen interviews with a variety of Jewish comedy professionals in North America and explores the role of Jewish humour in the context of North American comedy. The filmmaker asks whether earlier generations of Jews were funnier than the present generation and, if so, why. The film becomes more personal as its focus shifts to the filmmaker's desire to reconnect with a culture that has changed.

The film premiered at the 2013 Toronto International Film Festival (TIFF) on 10 September. It won TIFF's award for the best Canadian feature film and was named on TIFF's year-end Canada's Top Ten list. The film had a limited theatrical release on 15 November 2013.

== Premise ==
When Jews Were Funny is an exploration of Jewish-American comedy and its influence on modern American humour. The film looks at the conditions that resulted in the high proportion of Jewish comedians in the 1950s and 1960s. The context of comedy is then used to begin discussions of Jewish identity. The film also focuses on the tendency for immigrant cultures to lose uniqueness through assimilation and the importance of maintaining valued traditions.

== Interviews ==
All interviewees are Jewish comedians, writers, or otherwise in the comedy profession. In order of appearance:

- Shelley Berman
- Jack Carter
- Shecky Greene
- Norm Crosby (his last filmed interview)
- David Steinberg
- David Brenner
- Bob Einstein
- Modi
- Gilbert Gottfried
- Stewie Stone
- Andy Kindler
- Ed Crasnick
- Mark Breslin
- Perry Rosemond
- Howie Mandel
- Michael Wex
- Marc Maron
- Mark Schiff
- Judy Gold
- Elon Gold
- Howard Busgang
- Eugene Mirman
- Cory Kahaney
- Simon Rakoff
- Jonathan Silverstein

Additionally, brief performance archival clips are shown for the following stand-up comedians, in order of appearance:

- Julian Rose
- Alan King
- Rodney Dangerfield
- Harvey Stone
- Henny Youngman
- Jackie Mason

== Plot summary ==
When Jews Were Funny begins with a clip of Shelley Berman, who appears unenthusiastic while told he will be having a conversation with filmmaker Alan Zweig. An archival clip is shown of Julian Rose, performing with a thick accent as "Our Hebrew Friend", denigrating his own show, "I think it's rotten". The film's opening credits play.

Berman and other comedians of his era disagree with Zweig's notion that Jewish humour is unique, arguing they did not use their culture for laughs. A television clip shows Alan King providing a Jewish perspective on a domineering wife. Shifting to the following generation, there is a change in perspective. David Steinberg states, "Jews owned humour", while Mark Breslin states, "The history of 20th-century humour is Jewish, period." Breslin compares comedy to Jewish jazz and other interviewees say the rhythm of Yiddish (Note: The older interviewees frequently refer to Yiddish as "mama lushen", the mother tongue.) has a comedic timing. Several comedians note that, as children, they had at least one older Jewish relative they consider to be as funny as modern professional comedians.

Several of the interviewees opine Jewish humour resulted as a survival mechanism. They suggest that, as Jews were a long-oppressed people, they became frequent complainers, which became a way of life. The interviewees suggest the older generation of Jews they knew were so used to bad times they felt guilty or uncomfortable in good times. Rather than admit positivity, Jews used sarcasm, returned questions with questions, and employed a hostile passive-aggressiveness. The interviewees suggest comedy became a way for Jews to express themselves; they had an outsider perspective that helped find jokes and a sarcastic edge that could address taboo subjects. It is further noted the critical nature of Jews made them tough audiences, so the Borscht Belt provided venues for Jewish comedians to hone their acts.

The Jews' tight-knit community and shared experience began to disappear with assimilation, and success within North American society removed their reasons to complain or be fearful. Zweig states humour was his strongest connection with Jewish culture and is concerned he will lose this connection once the older generation of Jews are gone. Some interviewees suggest solutions; Howie Mandel says of Jewish humour; "it's still there, we just have different accents".

Zweig's motives are called into question throughout the film. Marc Maron suggests Zweig is nostalgic for the older Yiddish mannerisms that made him laugh and feel comforted as a child. Zweig notes his wife is not Jewish and that he has become concerned about their young daughter's upbringing, worrying his mother-in-law will secretly have her baptized. Cory Kahaney notes Judaism is about the freedom to ask questions, that there is no single approach to being a Jew and that Zweig can find a way to raise his daughter that works for him and his wife.

Berman notes the connection he feels while speaking with someone in Yiddish. While recalling his dead son, he becomes moved to sing a song in Yiddish, which he explains means "the town I grew up in, I'm missing" – that the past cannot be revisited, but can be recollected in sharing stories of it. During the closing credits, Zweig is shown on camera for the first time, with his wife and daughter in a deli.

== Development and financing ==
As a child, filmmaker Alan Zweig found it paradoxical to be told the world was unkind to Judaism but saw Jewish performers among the best comedians. Zweig distanced himself from his Jewish heritage as an adult, but felt he retained a connection to it, especially to the comedy and sarcasm. As he entered middle age, he found himself missing characteristics of the older generation of Jews which were disappearing.

Zweig stated in an interview he initially resisted the idea of the project – of mixing his heritage with his professional life. However, he realized he had "unresolved issues" and used the film to address them, while keeping the film accessible to audiences. He felt the interview subjects were "the most articulate and funniest people" and wanted the chance to meet them. However, he found it a challenge to interview frequently-interviewed celebrities and draw them out of set routines.

Financing for the film was arranged under the partnership Funny Jews Inc. The film received initial financing of $211,000 from the Canadian Media Fund. After obtaining a broadcast deal with Super Channel, additional financing was secured from Rogers Telefund.

== Production ==
Zweig had a wish-list of about 40 Jewish comics he wanted to interview. Some unavailable on his tight filming schedule included Jerry Seinfeld, Jon Stewart, Sarah Silverman, and Mel Brooks. Some of the interviewees were comedy heroes of Zweig, such as Shecky Greene.

When Jews Were Funny was made simultaneously with Zweig's 2013 documentary, 15 Reasons to Live. He shot Jews while on breaks from Reasons and edited it after editing Reasons. When Jews Were Funny was produced by Jesse Ikeman and Jeff Glickman for Sudden Storm Entertainment. Naomi Wise served as cinematographer, (Note: Wise also shot 15 Reasons to Live.) with editing by Randy Zimmer and music by Michael Zweig. The film is 89 minutes long.

Zweig stated during an interview he discovered he "like[d] being around Jews ... more than I ever would have acknowledged" because of their inherent understanding of his experience. Zweig later noted exploring his own culture in the film gave him perspective before filming the people of Nunavut for the documentary There Is a House Here.

== Release ==
The film premiered on 10 September at the 2013 Toronto International Film Festival (TIFF). The film had a limited released in theatres on 15 November 2013, with a total box office of CA$22,697 in four theatres after two weeks, which placed it among the top five domestic films of those weeks.

With a limited number of prints, the film was shown in some arthouse theatres and film festivals, including: 9 January 2014, New York Jewish Film Festival; 29 January 2014, Miami Jewish Film Festival; 13 April 2014, Minneapolis–Saint Paul International Film Festival; Atlanta Jewish Film Festival, and the Domestic Arrivals Documentary Film Series in London, Ontario.

The first broadcast rights were held by Super Channel, with broadcast rights transferred to Documentary Channel in 2015. The film was released on DVD by First Run Features in Canada and the US on 1 April 2014. The film was put on Netflix in New Zealand.

== Critical reception ==
Critical response to the film was mixed to positive, with a 67% approval rating on review aggregator Rotten Tomatoes.

The Hollywood Reporter found the film to be more entertaining and produced better than similar "comedy-nerd doc" When Comedy Went to School, but felt Zweig's personal quest limited the film's marketability. The Montreal Gazette similarly felt Zweig's presence in the film was too large, and that he worked too hard to prove the premise of the film's title. Also, they felt the film was not outstanding as a comedy or a documentary. Jordan Hoffman of The Times of Israel wrote the film lacked insight or originality, and that When Comedy Went to School was more successful.

Alison Gilmor of CBC News described the film as an "insightful, intelligent, laugh-out-loud documentary" and possibly the best examination of comedy mechanics since The Aristocrats (2005). The Londoner felt the film showed distinctive takes on being Jewish from some of the funniest people in entertainment. Screen Rant called the film a "fascinating" exploration of the subject material.

Dave McGinn of The Globe and Mail called it "an entertaining, often engrossing look" at its subject material, and found Zweig's earnest desire to find answers kept the film from getting tired. Michael Fox of Jewish Independent found the film to be "unexpectedly provocative", using a first-person perspective and intimate structure to invite the audience into the discussion. Anthony Kaufman of Screen Daily found unexpected entertainment in Zweig's purposely vague interview style – with "stops and starts and stutters" – which provoked his subjects into questioning the filmmaker in an authentically Jewish manner. Kaufman also found the film to be intimate and heartfelt when it focuses on Zweig's personal quest. Miriam Rinn of the Jewish Standard felt the film will reach Jewish audiences due to its "nostalgia for the past [and] fear for the future" of Jewish culture, and that the film was "profoundly Jewish" in its inclusion of dissension and lack of consensus.

== Awards ==
The film was chosen as the Best Canadian Feature at the 2013 Toronto International Film Festival and received a $30,000 prize. The jury noted the film for "its deeply moving exploration of memory, identity and community and for its coherent and profoundly humorous representation of the personal as universal."

The film was also included on TIFF's year-end Canada's Top Ten list as one of the ten best Canadian films of 2013.

== See also ==
- Being Canadian – documentary examining Canadian comedy and identity
- Why We Laugh: Black Comedians on Black Comedy – documentary on the evolution of African-American comedy
