= Curmudgeons Day =

Informal annual holiday

Curmudgeons Day is an informal holiday celebrated annually on January 29, honoring chronically grumpy, irritable, or skeptically minded individuals.

== Background ==
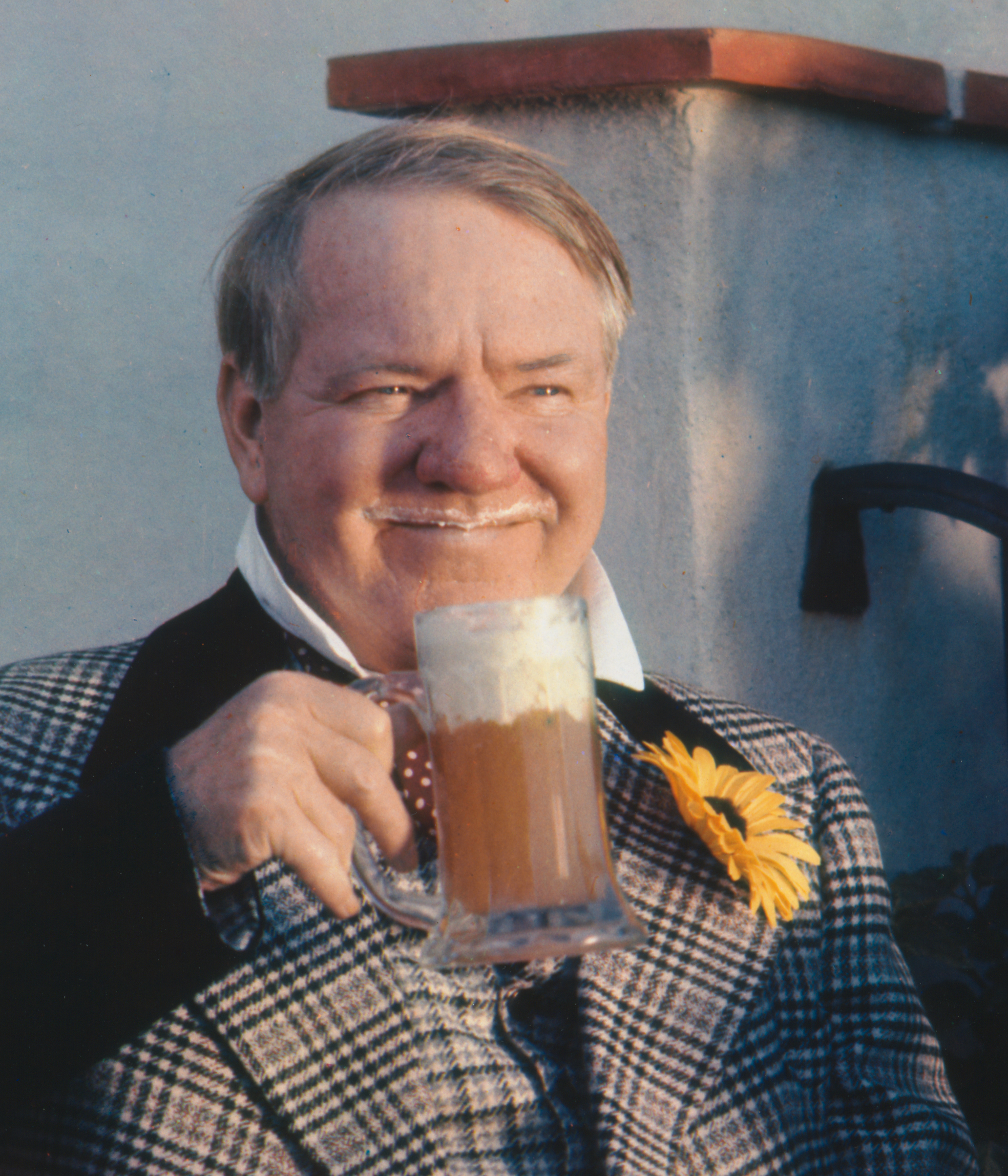
W. C. Fields (1938)

The date was chosen to mark the birthday of American entertainer W. C. Fields (1880–1946), who was widely regarded as the archetypal lovable curmudgeon, often portraying characters who scorned children, dogs, and social conventions. The holiday is believed to have been initiated by the U.S. radio station WBGZ.

Traditionally, a "curmudgeon" refers to an irritable, frequently older person who enjoys complaining. In contemporary observance, the day emphasizes authenticity and candidness rather than mere negativity.

‘The Portable Curmudgeon’ by Jon Winokur gives the following definitions of the word ‘curmudgeon’:

1 archaic: a crusty, ill-tempered, churlish old man

2 modern: anyone, who hates hypocrisy and pretense and has the temerity to say so; anyone with the habit of pointing out unpleasant facts in an engaging and humorous manner
