= Milo 55160 =

- Directed by: David Ostry
- Written by: David Ostry
- Produced by: Matthew Cervi
- Starring: Patrick McKenna; Graham Kartna
- Cinematography: Jordan Lynn
- Edited by: Robert Swartz
- Production companies: Mad Hat Productions; Niceville Pictures; Canadian Film Centre
- Distributed by: Flow Distribution
- Release date: June 7, 2004
- Running time: 20 minutes
- Country: Canada
- Language: English

Milo 55160 is a Canadian short film, directed by David Ostry and released in 2004.

The film stars Patrick McKenna as Milo 55160, a bureaucrat in heaven whose job is to process the paperwork for newly dead people to enter the afterlife. One day, however, a young boy (Graham Kartna) arrives still clutching his most cherished earthly possession, meaning that the boy is not fully dead. Milo must therefore decide whether to confiscate the toy and assure the boy's death, or to send the boy back to the land of the living but risk missing his processing quota.

== Accolades ==
The film won the Genie Award for Best Live Action Short Drama at the 26th Genie Awards. McKenna won the award for Best Actor at the Yorkton Film Festival.
