= Vinyl (2000 film) =

- Directed by: Alan Zweig
- Produced by: Greg Klymkiw
- Release date: 2000
- Country: Canada
- Language: English

Vinyl is a 2000 documentary film by Toronto filmmaker/record collector Alan Zweig. In the film, Zweig seeks not to talk to people who collect vinyl records to discuss music, but rather to discuss what drives someone to collect records in the first place. Zweig spends a large portion of the film in stylized self-filmed "confessions", where he expounds on his life in regard to record collecting, feeling it has prevented him from fulfilling his dream of a family.

In addition to celebrities like Canadian director/actor Don McKellar and American Splendor creator Harvey Pekar, Zweig speaks to a variety of record collectors. Collectors include a car wash employee who claims to own over one million records and claims to have memorized the track listing of every K-tel collection he owns, a government employee who refuses to organize his collection because he doesn't want people to come over and a man who threw out his large record collection rather than sell or give it away because he didn't want anyone else to own it.
