= Alan Zweig =

Canadian documentary filmmaker

- Born: Toronto, Ontario, Canada
- Occupation: Documentary Filmmaker
- Known for: Vinyl, Hurt

Alan Zweig is a Canadian documentary filmmaker known for often using film to explore his own life.

== Early life ==
Alan Zweig was born and raised in Toronto, Ontario and has worked in the film industry as a writer, producer, director, driver, and actor. Before finding success as a filmmaker, Alan Zweig drove a taxi for fifteen years. Early in his career, Zweig’s short films — Trip Sheet (1976), The Boys (1977) and Stealing Images (1989) – provide rare insight into his early inspirations, influences and themes. They run the gamut from documentary to mock doc to fiction.

Trip Sheet was Zweig’s first film, an impressionistic hybrid doc made in his first year at Sheridan College. Shot on colour reversal stock, the film follows cab drivers on their daily beat, a profession that Zweig himself pursued throughout the 1980s. Unseen for more than 30 years, The Boys, an improvised film shot in semi-vérité style, stars four strangers as best friends. The award-winning fiction film Stealing Images, investigates the notion of the unreliable narrator, the protagonist as poseur. Zweig used a composite of film world acquaintances to shape his lead character, a film director who seems to have everything going for him, but in reality has nothing going on at all. Stealing Images sits where autobiography and parody meet, and is perhaps less a reflection and more a projection of Zweig’s struggle with his own perceived failure. This collection of shorts bridges the gap between Zweig’s work in fiction films and introduces themes, questions and techniques that resurface in his later documentaries.

In his documentary work, Alan never pretends not to be there, placing himself inside the narrative along with the rest of his subjects. His use of first-person video diary is a strong method of self-analysis, introspection and presence that speaks to the audience as if there were no camera in the room. This sharing of personal experiences, neuroses, fantasies and opinions acts as an empathetic way of drawing out the same in others. Zweig has honed a conversational interview style and easy repartee with his subjects that presents vulnerability and honesty in his interviews.

== Career ==
Alan first became known for his 1989 film Stealing Images, a short drama about a filmmaker exploring the city which won the award for Best Canadian Short Film at the 1989 Toronto International Film Festival. He also later directed the narrative feature film The Darling Family, before turning to documentary film.

In his 2000 film Vinyl, Zweig explores what drives people to become record collectors. Zweig spends a large portion of the film exploring his own life in regard to record collecting, feeling it has prevented him from fulfilling his dreams of a family.

I, Curmudgeon is a 2004 film about self-declared curmudgeons, himself included, which received a Silver Hugo at the 2005 Chicago International Film Festival. The film was shot on a camcorder, with Zweig using a mirror to record his own experiences.

Lovable is a 2007 film about our preoccupation with finding romantic perfection.

In 2009, Zweig moved from autobiographical subject matter to explore the struggle of ex-convicts to lead normal lives in A Hard Name, which received the Genie Award for best documentary.

His 2013 film When Jews Were Funny, an exploration of the role of Jewish comedians in North American comedy and humour, won the prize for Best Canadian Feature Film at the 2013 Toronto International Film Festival. Again, he uses most of the movie exploring his own position as a Jew married to a non-Jewish woman and a new father.

Hurt, his documentary film about Steve Fonyo, was released in 2015. It won the Platform Prize at the 2015 Toronto International Film Festival.

His film There Is a House Here, premiered at the 2017 Toronto International Film Festival, and Coppers premiered at the 2019 Toronto International Film Festival.

== Films ==
=== Vinyl (2000) ===
In Vinyl, Zweig seeks not to talk to people who collect vinyl records to discuss music, but rather to discuss what drives someone to collect records in the first place. Zweig spends a large portion of the film in stylized self-filmed "confessions", where he expounds on his life in regard to record collecting, feeling it has prevented him from fulfilling his dreams of a family.

In addition to celebrities like Canadian director/actor Don McKellar and American Splendor creator Harvey Pekar, Zweig speaks to a variety of record collectors. Collectors include a car wash employee who claims to own over one million records and claims to have memorized the track listing of every K-Tel collection he owns, a government employee who refuses to organize his collection because he doesn't want people to come over and a man who threw out his large record collection rather than sell or give it away because he didn't want anyone else to own it.

Vinyl was ranked one of Pitchfork's 20 Essential Music Docs in 2013.

=== A Hard Name (2009) ===
In this film, Zweig interviews seven ex-convicts about their times in prison and their struggle to maintain lives outside of prison walls. The men talk about insights they have gained about their lives, including how childhood abuse led to a life of crime. Film subjects include one man who stabbed fellow inmate Clifford Olson 21 times, before Olson committed his serial killings.

Another of the film's subjects was abused as a child while a resident at the Mount Cashel Orphanage in St. John's, Newfoundland and Labrador. A Hard Name ends with archival television footage of him performing, playing the guitar and singing for other young residents of the home.

=== I, Curmudgeon (2004) ===
Alan Zweig interviews notable curmudgeons like Fran Lebowitz, Harvey Pekar and Bruce LaBruce. Zweig wants to know what their problem is and, more importantly, whether it’s the same as his. Zweig analyzes the fallout of his negativity, shaving it down and focusing its meaning with the help of hilarious and honest insights from his raucous cast of misfits.

The film cleverly examines the risks of being a naysayer in a society continually pitching the positive. For Zweig, the naysayers are today's heroes, the ones who are not afraid to say, 'Hey, the emperor has no clothes!'

=== Lovable (2007) ===
In this final instalment of the autobiographical trilogy that includes Vinyl and I, Curmudgeon, Alan Zweig reflects with disarming candour on why, if he longs for a partner and children, he is still single at mid-life. The film analyzes his lack of success finding a partner while also interviewing a couple of dozen single women of various ages and backgrounds. It turns into a probing and occasionally profound examination of love in the 21st century.

Zweig asks the women some tough questions, digging through their denial and getting some insightful, articulate answers.

=== When Jews Were Funny (2013) ===
Surveying the history of Jewish comedy from the early days of the Borsht Belt to the present, When Jews Were Funny explores not just ethnicity in the entertainment industry, but also the question of what it means to be Jewish.

The film features interviews with and/or performance clips of a wide variety of Jewish comedy performers and writers of the 20th and 21st centuries, including Howie Mandel, Gilbert Gottfried, Rodney Dangerfield, Eugene Mirman, Marc Maron, Bob Einstein, Andy Kindler, Shelley Berman, Alan King, Judy Gold, Elon Gold, David Steinberg, Jackie Mason, Jack Carter, Norm Crosby, Henny Youngman, David Brenner, Shecky Greene, Mark Breslin, Cory Kahaney, Harrison Greenbaum, Simon Rakoff, Lisa Lambert, Larry Josephson and Michael Wex.

The film won the Best Canadian Feature Film prize at the 2013 Toronto International Film Festival and was listed as one of Canada's Top Ten Films that year.

=== 15 Reasons to Live (2013) ===
Inspired by the non-fiction book "Why Not: Fifteen Reasons to Live" by Ray Robertson, this film is an examination on the nature of human happiness by looking at the personal stories of 15 individuals. Through their stories, Zweig compiles his reasons to live: love, solitude, critical mind, art, individuality, home, work, humour, friendship, intoxication, praise, meaning, body, duty and death. This is the first of his films to include the use of animation.

=== Hurt (2015) ===
Hurt follows Steve Fonyo, the celebrated Canadian runner with an artificial leg who raised millions of dollars for cancer research, only to decline into addiction and homelessness. Literally following in the footsteps of Terry Fox, Fonyo ran across Canada to raise awareness for cancer research and went on to receive the Order of Canada, before it was later stripped from him when his image as a cancer survivor and athlete changed following drug addictions and run-ins with the law. The film includes sequences where Zweig arranged (and captured) meetings between Fonyo and the esteemed Dr. Gabor Maté, an expert in addictions and childhood trauma.

The film won the inaugural Platform Prize at the 2015 Toronto International Film Festival. The film was also named one as part of TIFF's annual Canada's Top Ten screening series of the ten best Canadian films of the year.

At the 4th Canadian Screen Awards in 2016, Hurt won the award for Best Feature Length Documentary.

=== Hope (2017) ===
This sequel to the 2015 documentary Hurt picks up as Steve Fonyo recovers from his coma and admits that he needs to make changes to his life if he is going to be able to continue on. Recovering in hospital, Steve allows Zweig to follow him through his lows, hoping he might find a way to a better life. In the 30 years since he was a nation’s hero for his cross-country run on a prosthetic leg to raise funds for cancer research, Steve’s life has been a sequence of tragic events. Now in his 50s, Steve admits he needs to remove himself from his circumstances in Surrey, BC, to overcome his addiction and have a fresh start with his girlfriend. Bringing director-subject dynamics to the forefront, the film is a documentary sequel that attempts to look at the road forward and leave a troubled past behind.

=== There is a House Here (2017) ===
Taking its name from the English translation of Igloolik, There Is A House Here, Alan tells a “fish out of water”. The fish is himself, an urban Jew. The environment strange to him is the damaged culture of Inuit in the high Arctic. Despite a long and frank email relationship with Inuk heavy-metal rocker Lucie Idlout, Alan finds himself unable to truly understand why Canada’s aboriginal people cannot “get over” the injuries of colonialism. With Lucie as his guide, Alan Zweig goes to Nunavut, a place that admittedly frightens him, in the hope of having his skepticism defeated and gaining some answers to bring back to his “equally ignorant countrymen”.

The film premiered at the 2017 Toronto International Film Festival.

=== Coppers (2019) ===
His latest film, Coppers, is centred on former police officers as they recount the traumas that continues to haunt them long after they turned in their gun and shield. Zweig’s insightful questioning and sympathetic tone allows a space where some pretty astonishing things are revealed, both about the nature of police work and, inadvertently, about some of the personal flaws of those that choose the profession in the first place.

A sort of companion piece to A Hard Name, his 2009 documentary about former inmates, Coppers interviews a dozen or so retired police officers. Although their beats ranged from large and mid-level cities to very small towns, their experiences, perhaps surprisingly, are quite similar. As one ex-cop remarks, "No one calls the police when they're having a great day." Most have witnessed scenes anyone would have a hard time living with. One officer describes a murder suicide where the killer dispatched his victim with a statue of a German shepherd and a cassette recorder. Another, assigned to a particularly harsh detail, breaks down in tears, overwhelmed by the amount of horrifying evidence he had to comb through.

A disarming interviewer, Zweig lets his subjects talk about what troubled them most: high stress, horrific crimes, racism, sexism, and guilt (one cop is still haunted by the day he nearly killed a young girl who wandered into a confrontation scene). But Zweig doesn't avoid probing questions, particularly about the officers' and their colleagues' transgressions, personal and otherwise. Even if he gets evasive answers, the responses remain incredibly telling.

Coppers had its World Premiere at the 2019 Toronto International Film Festival and was ranked one of the Top 10 Canadian Films of 2019 by The Globe and Mail.

=== Records (2021) ===
Twenty-one years after Alan Zweig's groundbreaking first feature documentary Vinyl, Zweig returns to the topic of compulsive record collecting with newfound introspection and a sunnier disposition.

=== Love, Harold (2025) ===
Love, Harold, a documentary film about people grappling with grief after a loved one has committed suicide, is slated to premiere at the 2025 Calgary International Film Festival.

== Awards, Honours and Nominations ==
- 1989: Stealing Images won Best Canadian Short Film at the Toronto International Film Festival
- 1989: Stealing Images was nominated for Gold Hugo Best Short Film award
- 2004: I, Curmudgeon won the Chicago International Film Festival Silver Hugo Prize
- 2009: A Hard Name won the Canadian Screen Award for Best Documentary Feature
- 2010: A Hard Name received the Genie Award for Best Feature Length Documentary
- 2011: Hot Docs devoted its Focus On screening series to Zweig's work
- 2013: 15 Reasons to Live was nominated for Best Canadian Documentary at Hot Docs Canadian International Documentary Festival
- 2013: When Jews Were Funny won Best Canadian Feature Film at the Toronto International Film Festival
- 2015: Hurt won the Platform Prize at the Toronto International Film Festival
- 2016: Hurt won the Ted Rogers Award for Best Feature Length Documentary at the Canadian Screen Awards
- 2017: There Is a House Here was nominated for Best Canadian Feature Film at the Toronto International Film Festival
- 2017: There Is a House Here received an Honourable Mention for World Documentary at the Whistler Film Festival
- 2019: Coppers was nominated for Best Canadian Feature Film at the Toronto International Film Festival
