= 1989 Toronto International Film Festival =

Annual Canadian film festival

- Festival poster
- Opening film: In Country
- Location: Toronto, Ontario, Canada
- Hosted by: Toronto International Film Festival Group
- Festival date: September 7, 1989–September 16, 1989
- Language: English
- Website: tiff.net
- 1990 1988

The 14th Toronto International Film Festival (TIFF) took place in Toronto, Ontario, Canada between September 7 and September 16, 1989. In Country by Norman Jewison was selected as the opening film.

== Awards ==
Award	Film	Director
People's Choice Award	Roger & Me	Michael Moore
Best Canadian Feature Film	Roadkill	Bruce McDonald
Best Canadian Short Film	Stealing Images	Alan Zweig
Best Canadian Short Film, Honorable Mention	Justine's Film	Jeanne Crépeau
International Critics' Award	Jesus of Montreal	Denys Arcand

== Programme ==
=== Gala Presentation ===
- In Country by Norman Jewison
- Drugstore Cowboy by Gus Van Sant
- Life and Nothing But by Bertrand Tavernier
- Mystery Train by Jim Jarmusch
- The Killer by John Woo
- The Seventh Continent by Michael Haneke
- My Left Foot by Jim Sheridan
- Cinema Paradiso by Giuseppe Tornatore
- The Cook, the Thief, His Wife & Her Lover by Peter Greenaway
- Sweetie by Jane Campion
- Apartment Zero by Martin Donovan
- Under the Glacier by Guðný Halldórsdóttir
- Monsieur Hire by Patrice Leconte
- Aviya's Summer by Eli Cohen
- A Dry White Season by Euzhan Palcy
- Needle by Rashid Nugmanov
- Chattahoochee by Mick Jackson

=== Canadian Perspectives ===
- American Boyfriends by Sandy Wilson
- Black Mother, Black Daughter by Sylvia Hamilton and Claire Prieto
- Brown Bread Sandwiches by Carlo Liconti
- Bye Bye Blues by Anne Wheeler
- Cold Comfort by Vic Sarin
- Foreign Nights by Izidore K. Musallam
- In the Belly of the Dragon by Yves Simoneau
- Jesus of Montreal by Denys Arcand
- Justice Denied by Paul Cowan
- Lessons on Life by Jacques Leduc
- Roadkill by Bruce McDonald
- Sous les draps, les étoiles by Jean-Pierre Gariépy
- Speaking Parts by Atom Egoyan
- Stealing Images by Alan Zweig
- Strand: Under the Dark Cloth by John Walker
- Tending Towards the Horizontal by Barbara Sternberg
- Termini Station by Allan King
- The Top of His Head by Peter Mettler
- The Traveller by Bruno Lazaro
- Unfaithful Mornings by François Bouvier and Jean Beaudry
- The Vacant Lot by William D. MacGillivray
- Welcome to Canada by John N. Smith
- Where the Spirit Lives by Bruce Pittman

=== Midnight Madness ===
- Dr. Caligari by Stephen Sayadian
- Lenny Live and Unleashed by Andy Harries
- Opera by Dario Argento
- Carnival of Souls by Herk Harvey
- Alien Space Avenger by Richard W. Haines
- Funny by Bran Ferren
- Over Easy by Ignacio Valero
- Shimmelsteen by Michael Wolfe
- No Such Thing As Gravity by Alyce Wittenstein
- Whoregasm by Nick Zedd
- Urotsukidoji: Legend of the Over-Fiend by Hideki Takayama
- Heavy Petting by Obie Benz

=== Documentaries ===
- The Big Bang by James Toback
- Eat the Kimono by Kim Longinotto and Jano Williams
- For All Mankind by Al Reinert
- Roger & Me by Michael Moore
- White Lake by Colin Browne
