= A Hard Name =

- Directed by: Alan Zweig
- Produced by: Kristina McLaughlin; Michael McMahon
- Cinematography: Alan Zweig
- Edited by: Randy Zimmer
- Production company: Primitive Entertainment
- Release date: May 3, 2009 (Hotdocs Film Festival)
- Running time: 100 minutes
- Country: Canada
- Language: English

A Hard Name is a 2009 documentary film by Alan Zweig that explores the lives of ex-convicts.

In the film, Zweig interviews seven ex-convicts about their times in prison and their lives on the outside. The men talk about insights they have gained about their lives, including how childhood abuse led to a life of crime. Film subjects include one man who stabbed fellow inmate Clifford Olson 21 times, before Olson committed his serial killings.

Another of the film's subjects was abused as a child while a resident at the Mount Cashel Orphanage in St. John's, Newfoundland and Labrador. A Hard Name ends with archival television footage of him performing, playing the guitar and singing for other young residents of the home.

Zweig admitted to be intimidated about doing these interviews:

"[...] Intimidated, I guess. Less by their danger and more by a male competitive thing, in a way…they’re going to see through me. They’re going to see that if I went to jail, I’d be an easy mark. I’m not as tough as them. I haven’t survived what they’ve survived and they’re just going to dismiss me as a weak citizen.”

However, the ex-convicts interviewed were surprisingly open to Zweig and allowed themselves to be shown as vulnerable.

== Release ==
A Hard Name premiered May 3, 2009 at the Royal Cinema in Toronto. The film received the Genie Award for Best Feature Length Documentary at the 30th Genie Awards in 2010. It was also chosen as one of the top ten audience favourites at the Hot Docs Canadian International Documentary Festival.
