= Coppers (film) =

2019 Canadian documentary film

- Directed by: Alan Zweig
- Written by: Alan Zweig
- Produced by: Michael McMahon; Kristina McLaughlin; Kevin McMahon
- Cinematography: John Price
- Edited by: Robert Swartz
- Music by: Michael Zweig
- Production company: Primitive Entertainment
- Release date: September 7, 2019 (TIFF)
- Running time: 86 minutes
- Country: Canada
- Language: English

Coppers is a 2019 Canadian documentary film, directed by Alan Zweig. The film features a number of retired police officers speaking about their professional experiences, highlighting the moral, ethical and emotional difficulties that they have to cope with.

The film premiered at the 2019 Toronto International Film Festival.

Norman Wilner of Now rated the film four N's, writing that "at a time when the police are presumed to be the enemy in almost every interaction with civilians – and not without evidence – Coppers might strike some as counter-propaganda. Instead, it plays like an exercise in empathy. Zweig lets us see these people as individuals who’ve experienced horrific things and come out the other side, or are still trying to make their way to some sort of peace."
