= Steve Fonyo =

Canadian fundraiser for cancer and runner with an artificial leg (1965–2022)

- Born: Stephen Charles Fonyo; June 29, 1965; Montreal, Quebec, Canada
- Died: February 18, 2022 (aged 56); Burnaby, British Columbia, Canada
- Education: Immaculate Conception School, Delta, British Columbia (to grade 10)
- Occupations: Mechanic; runner
- Known for: Journey for Lives
- Criminal charges: See text
- Spouse: Lisa Greenwood-Fonyo (married 2010–2014)
- Awards: Officer of the Order of Canada (revoked)

Stephen Charles Fonyo Jr. (June 29, 1965 – February 18, 2022) was a Canadian runner with an artificial leg who was a nationally renowned fundraiser for cancer research and treatment, and a onetime Officer of the Order of Canada.

== Journey for Lives ==
At age 12, Fonyo's left leg was amputated above the knee to prevent the spread of bone cancer. He left school in grade 10 to work in a lawnmower and chainsaw shop. In 1980, Fonyo saw a speech delivered by Terry Fox at Stanley Park. When Fox died the following year, Fonyo had what he described as an epiphany come to him to run across Canada, stating, "It came to me overnight. It was like a dream or something, like another force." The idea would not leave his head despite his own admission of not being athletic or particularly interested in raising money in a cross-country trip, saying, "My heart wasn’t there, not like Terry Fox’s. I always was a nice guy—I like helping people—but I wasn’t interested in any way in running across Canada."

In 1984, at age 18, he embarked on a run across Canada entitled Journey for Lives to raise funds for cancer research. The Canadian Cancer Society (specifically the BC chapter) were wary of any attempts that might taint the image of them or Fox's legacy in their rejection of Fonyo. Regardless, on March 31, he began his journey in St. John’s, Newfoundland. In doing so, he followed in the footsteps of Terry Fox. Fonyo began his run on March 31, 1984, and completed it 425 days later on May 29, 1985, covering 7,924 km (4,924 mi), and raising $14 million. Unlike Fox, who had to abandon the Marathon of Hope when his cancer returned, Fonyo completed the coast-to-coast run. He also completed a run across the United Kingdom.

He was named an Officer of the Order of Canada in 1985, the youngest person ever given that status at the time. This achievement was marred by grief, as his father Steve Fonyo Sr. died of lung cancer the next year.

== Later life and legal troubles ==
At some point, Fonyo began abusing alcohol and drugs. His first conviction for driving under the influence had come in 1982, although the conviction was made public only after further convictions for drunk driving six years later. He repeatedly ran afoul of the law, and was charged and convicted of various crimes.

In 1996, Fonyo pleaded guilty to 16 charges for offences in Edmonton, including assault with a weapon, aggravated assault, fraud for writing bad cheques totalling $10,000 to supermarkets, and possession of a stolen vehicle. He was also convicted at least five times of impaired driving, and seven times of driving without a licence, most recently in the fall of 2008. On August 13, 2009, Fonyo, last known to have been working as a heavy-machinery mechanic, appeared in BC Provincial Court in Surrey charged with one count of assault. He pleaded guilty and was sentenced to one day in jail. He was credited for ten days already served. He was also subject to a one-year probation order. But just five days later, the 44-year-old was back in court, having breached his conditions. He pleaded guilty and was sentenced to 14 days in jail.

His membership in the Order of Canada was revoked on December 10, 2009. On January 27, 2010, Fonyo gave a brief telephone interview to CTV News from the Surrey Remand Centre, where he was serving the balance of his sentence on an assault charge after breach of his parole. Fonyo stated it was wrong to have his Order of Canada revoked, as it was given to him for something he had previously done.

On August 6, 2010, he was again arrested for fraud. On August 28, 2010, Fonyo married Lisa Greenwood.

On December 7, 2010, Fonyo pleaded guilty to threatening Greenwood and to unrelated charges of fraud, credit card fraud, and driving with a suspended licence. By 2013, he had stated he had stopped drinking while contending that he was not an alcoholic.

In February 2015, friends and family reported to news media that Fonyo was in an induced coma in Royal Columbian Hospital after being stabbed by three assailants at his home in Whalley, a neighbourhood of Surrey. Doctors placed Fonyo in a medically induced coma for a month after the attack. Fonyo was diagnosed with a traumatic brain injury, which led to him being prescribed medication to prevent possible seizures.

== Death and legacy ==
While in the Vancouver area to have repairs made on his prosthetic foot, Fonyo died in a Burnaby hotel room, just after midnight on February 18, 2022, at the age of 56. Fonyo's partner since 2015, Lisa Marie Herbert, believed he had had a seizure, which his ex-wife thought was related to his traumatic brain injury.

Three roads are named after him: Steve Fonyo Drive in Kingston, Ontario and in Vankleek Hill, Ontario, and Fonyo Road in Prince Albert, Saskatchewan. There is a Steve Fonyo Beach in Victoria, British Columbia, where he ended his run and where he was later married in 2010.

In 2015, Fonyo was the subject of Alan Zweig's documentary film Hurt which covered Fonyo's decline into addiction and homelessness. It won the Platform Prize at the 2015 Toronto International Film Festival and the 2015 Canadian Screen Award for Best Feature Length Documentary Zweig followed up Hurt with the sequel Hope, released in 2017.

Film producer and screenwriter Greg Klymkiw, who wrote an open letter calling for Fonyo to be reinstated into the Order of Canada, said "I was frankly appalled that some persnickety pencil-pushers in the governor-general's office would have chosen to rescind this great honour for something absolutely amazing that Steve did at the age of 19. They looked at 30 years of Steve's (post-marathon) life when he was suffering from depression, mental illness and addiction, and essentially, because he was ill, they used this against him".

Hamilton Spectator sports columnist Scott Radley wrote "Yet at a time we're supposed to be more enlightened about addiction and possibly mental health problems, the near-complete purge of Fonyo from the public narrative somehow seems unfair. Especially when you wonder if this would've happened to him had he not faced the pressures of fame and expectations he was obviously ill-equipped to handle. All in the pursuit of raising money for charity."
