= Hurt (2015 film) =

- Directed by: Alan Zweig
- Written by: Alan Zweig
- Produced by: Peter Gentile; Mike Lalonde
- Starring: Steve Fonyo
- Cinematography: Ian Kerr; Jonathon Cliff; Chris Romeike
- Edited by: Robert Swartz
- Music by: Justin Small; Ohad Benchetrit
- Production company: MDF Productions
- Release date: September 14, 2015 (TIFF)
- Running time: 84 minutes
- Country: Canada
- Language: English

Hurt is a 2015 Canadian documentary film, directed by Alan Zweig. The film explores the troubled life of Steve Fonyo, the Canadian amputee athlete who completed a cross-Canada run that was known as the "Journey for Lives" to raise funds for cancer research in 1984 and 1985.

The film showcases Fonyo's resilience, not only the kind that kept an 18-year-old cancer survivor running the equivalent of a half marathon a day for 400 days for 7924 km. In addition to his 400-day run, the movie also depicts the downfalls of his life, including cocaine addiction, excessive drinking, surviving East Hastings, numerous stints in jail, having his prosthetic leg stolen, and being beaten and stabbed multiple times.

In 2017, Zweig released a sequel, Hope, which picks up from where Hurt left off, chronicling Fonyo's recovery.

== Awards ==
The film won the Platform Prize at the 2015 Toronto International Film Festival. In December, the film was announced as part of TIFF's annual Canada's Top Ten screening series of the ten best Canadian films of the year.

At the 4th Canadian Screen Awards in 2016, Hurt won the award for Best Feature Length Documentary.
