= Robert Swartz =

Canadian film and television editor

Robert Swartz is a Canadian film and television editor.

== Career ==
He is most noted as a two-time Gemini/Canadian Screen Award winner for his work in television, winning Best Picture Editing in a Comedy, Variety, Performing Arts Program or Series at the 24th Gemini Awards in 2009 for The Young Romantic, and Best Editing in a Documentary Program or Series at the 1st Canadian Screen Awards in 2013 for When Dreams Take Flight.

He also won the award for Best Editing in a Borsos Competition film at the 2023 Whistler Film Festival for The Boy in the Woods.

His other credits have included the films Milo 55160, The Good Student, How to Start Your Own Country, Hurt, There Is a House Here, Coppers, and Dispatches from a Field Hospital, and episodes of the television series Nova, Wild Things with Dominic Monaghan, Museum Secrets, Cold Water Cowboys, and The Nature of Things.

He also directed the short documentary films Provider (2004) and Cab 138 (2009).
