= The Sticky =

Canadian/American television series

- Genre: Heist crime thriller; Black comedy
- Created by: Brian Donovan; Ed Herro
- Directed by: Michael Dowse; Joyce Wong
- Starring: Margo Martindale; Chris Diamantopoulos; Guillaume Cyr
- Composer: FM Le Sieur
- Countries of origin: United States; Canada
- Original language: English
- No. of series: 1
- No. of episodes: 6

Production
- Executive producers: Brian Donovan; Ed Herro; Jonathan Levine; Gillian Bohrer; Jamie Lee Curtis; Jason Blum; Chris Dickie; Jeremy Gold; Michael Dowse; Lauren Grant; Josée Vallée; Bruno Dubé; Chris McCumber
- Production companies: Sphere Media; Comet Pictures; Megamix; Blumhouse Productions; Amazon MGM Studios

Original release
- Network: Amazon Prime Video
- Release: December 6, 2024

The Sticky is a 2024 black comedy series set in Quebec, Canada. Starring Margo Martindale and produced by Jason Blum and Jamie Lee Curtis, the show is loosely based on the Great Canadian Maple Syrup Heist. In February 2025, the series was canceled after one season.

== Premise ==
A Canadian maple syrup farmer finds her farm is under threat and plots to steal millions of dollars of maple syrup as revenge.

== Cast ==
- Margo Martindale as Ruth Landry
- Chris Diamantopoulos as Mike Byrne
- Guillaume Cyr as Remy Bouchard
- Gita Miller as Teddy Green
- Guy Nadon as Leonard Gauthier Sr.
- Mickaël Gouin as Léo Gauthier Jr.
- Suzanne Clément as Detective Valérie Nadeau
- Mark O'Brien as Charlie
- Meegwun Fairbrother as Gary Montour
- Jamie Lee Curtis as Bo Shea

== Episodes ==
| No. | Title | Directed by | Written by | Original release date |
|---|---|---|---|---|
| 1 | "Petiole" | Michael Dowse | Brian Donovan & Ed Herro | December 6, 2024 |
| 2 | "Insertion Point" | Michael Dowse | Brian Donovan & Ed Herro | December 6, 2024 |
| 3 | "Margins" | Joyce Wong | Adriana Maggs | December 6, 2024 |
| 4 | "Teeth" | Joyce Wong | Shannon Masters | December 6, 2024 |
| 5 | "Blade" | Michael Dowse | Brian Donovan & Ed Herro | December 6, 2024 |
| 6 | "Apex" | Michael Dowse | Brian Donovan & Ed Herro | December 6, 2024 |

== Production ==
The series creators are Brian Donovan and Ed Herro, who are also executive producers and showrunners. It is produced by Blumhouse Television, Comet Pictures, Megamix and Sphere Media. Executive producers include Jonathan Levine and Gillian Bohrer for Megamix, Jamie Lee Curtis for Comet Pictures, Jason Blum, Chris Dickie, Jeremy Gold and Chris McCumber for Blumhouse Television and Michael Dowse. Lauren Grant also serves as executive producer with Josée Vallée and Bruno Dubé for Sphere Media, Inc. Russell Goldman associate produces for Comet Pictures.

The series is directed by Michael Dowse and Joyce Wong, with filming taking in place in Quebec in 2023 with filming locations including Montreal and Saint-Eustache.

The cast is led by Margo Martindale, Chris Diamantopoulos and Guillaume Cyr, and features Gita Millier, Guy Nadon, Mickaël Gouin, Suzanne Clément, Mark O'Brien, and Meegwun Fairbrother. Jamie Lee Curtis has a guest role.

== Release ==
The series debuted on Amazon Prime Video on 6 December 2024.

== Reception ==
On the review aggregator website Rotten Tomatoes, The Sticky holds an approval rating of 80%, based on 17 reviews with an average rating of 7.4/10. The website's critics consensus reads, "Spinning a spiky yarn with a memorable posse of eccentric characters drizzled on top, The Sticky lays it on thick and is all the more entertaining for it." On Metacritic, which uses a weighted average, the series holds a score of 67/100 based on 16 critics, indicating "generally favorable" reviews.

Anita Singh in The Daily Telegraph awarded the series four stars and said it was "tremendous fun”. Nate Richard for Collider compared it to the television series Fargo, describing it as "a story about grief, murder, the mafia, and, of course, maple syrup".
