= Stealing Images =

1989 film

- Directed by: Alan Zweig
- Written by: Alan Zweig
- Produced by: Alan Zweig
- Cinematography: Jorge Montesi
- Edited by: Michael Werth; Alan Zweig
- Music by: James Pett
- Release date: September 1989 (TIFF)
- Running time: 28 minutes
- Country: Canada
- Language: English

Stealing Images is a Canadian short drama film, directed by Alan Zweig and released in 1989. The film centres on a film director who is exploring the city for inspiration.

The film premiered at the 1989 Toronto International Film Festival, where it won the award for Best Canadian Short Film.
