= Great Canadian Maple Syrup Heist =

2011–2012 theft

The Great Canadian Maple Syrup Heist (French: vol de sirop d'érable du siècle, lit. 'maple syrup heist of the century') was the theft over several months in 2011 and 2012 of nearly 3,000 tonnes (3,000 long tons; 3,300 short tons) of maple syrup, valued at C$18.7 million (equivalent to C$25.2 million in 2025) from a storage facility in Quebec. The facility was operated by the Federation of Quebec Maple Syrup Producers (French: Fédération des producteurs acéricoles du Québec, FPAQ) which represents 77 percent of the global maple syrup supply.

Adjusted for inflation, the heist was the most valuable in Canadian history until the 2023 Toronto Pearson International Airport gold heist.

== Origins ==
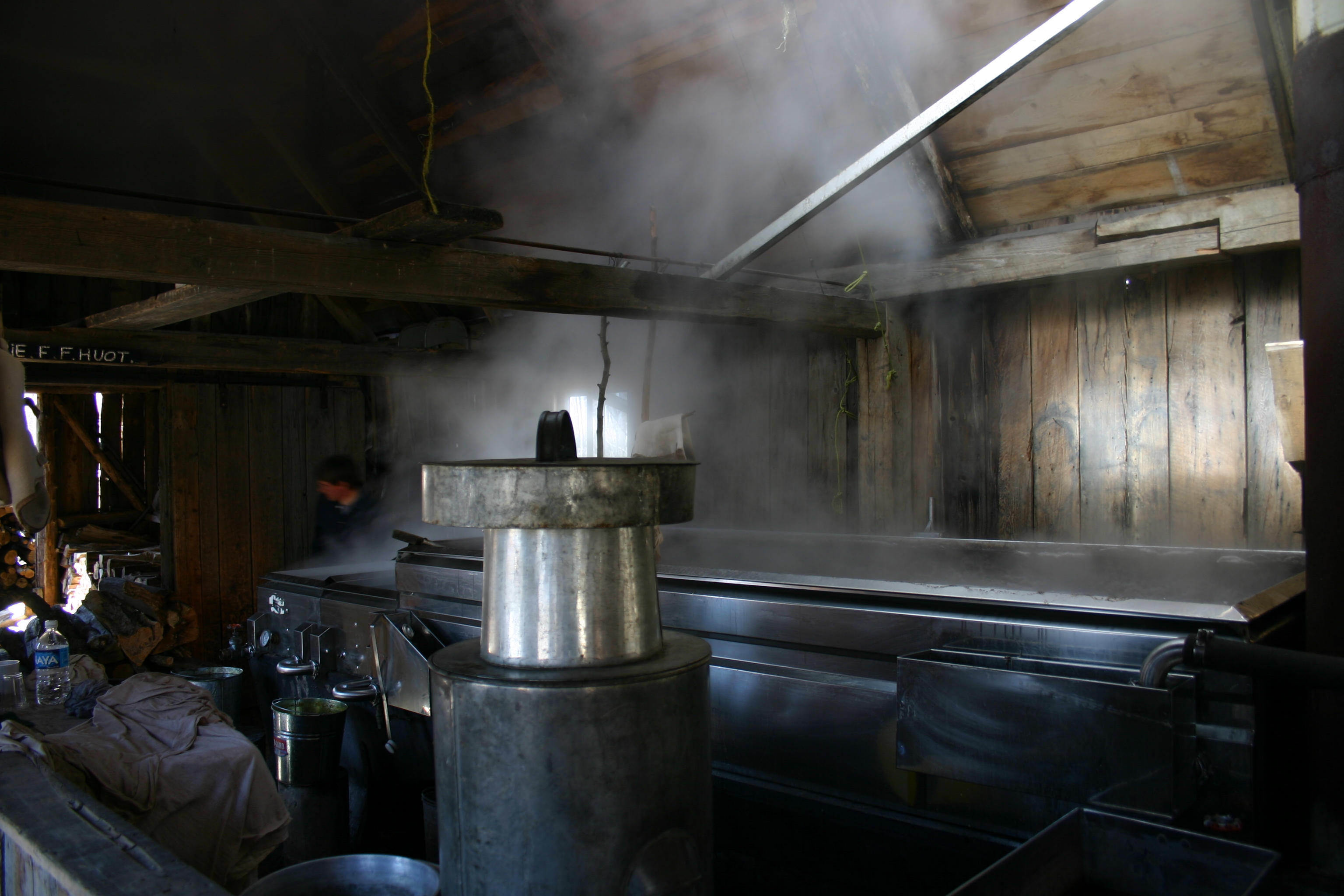
Syrup production in a Quebec sugar house (2005)

In 1958, a group of maple syrup producers in Quebec participated in a plan to jointly market maple syrup. This effort inspired the creation of a larger agreement in 1966 that spread throughout Quebec, an agreement that became known as the Federation of Maple Syrup Producers of Quebec (French: Fédération des producteurs acéricoles du Québec, FPAQ), known since 2018 as the Quebec Maple Syrup Producers (French: Producteurs et productrices acéricoles du Québec, PPAQ). In a series of steps between 1989 and 2003, its powers were expanded from a limited mandate of negotiating prices to the status of a legal cartel, since all syrup produced in Quebec must be sold to the federation and it has sole control over setting prices and production quotas.

As of 2000, the Federation maintains a strategic reserve of maple syrup, officially known as the International Strategic Reserve (ISR), housed at four sites in rural towns in Quebec. The pool was established by charging producers to transfer 25 percent of their crops to the pool, which made it possible to stabilize the price of maple syrup despite the fluctuations in output, which changes every year, which in turn facilitated marketing to food producers and helped maintain high prices. The producers get paid for the syrup they gave to the reservoir only when it is sold. The syrup is stored in barrels where, under proper storage conditions, it can be kept for years.

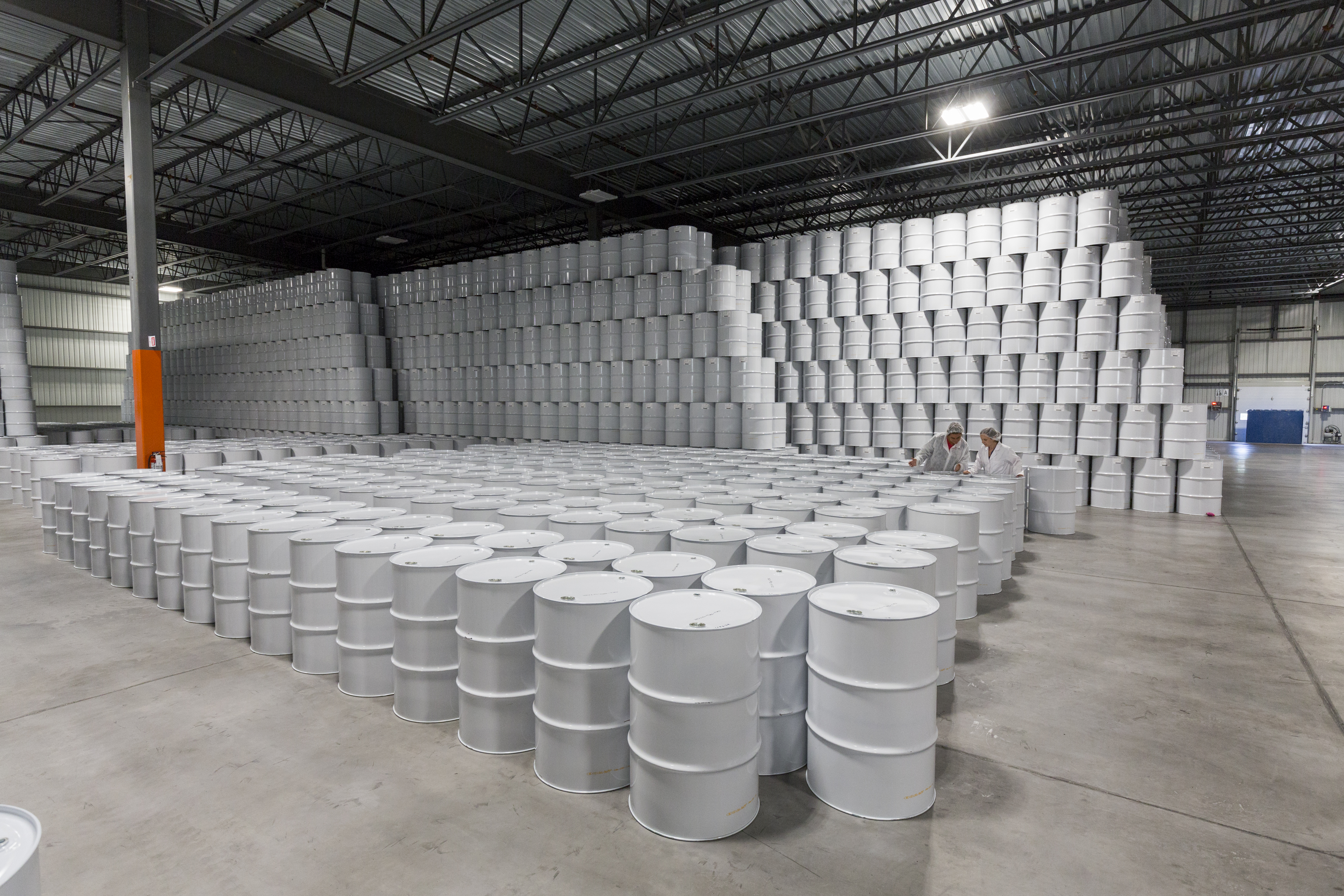
Strategic reserve barrels in Laurierville in 2016

In 2006 there was a theft of a thousand maple barrels worth about 1.3 million Canadian dollars from another warehouse that was partly the responsibility of the federation, a theft that was never solved and its damages were covered by the insurance company. In 2008, after two or three consecutive years of bad weather that reduced the syrup output, the strategic reservoir was emptied.

The federation controlled about 8,000 producers and strictly policed production quotas, which drew much criticism. In some cases, fines for repeat offenders who violated federation quotas accumulated to amounts of CAD $500,000 and more. Around 2010, protests broke out that caused the federation to place guards in the territories of producers and even to confiscate entire crops from rebel producers. The federation for its part claimed that it represented the interest of the producers by guaranteeing fair prices while creating a type of insurance for fluctuations in output by maintaining the strategic syrup stock.

Following a particularly good year, in 2011 the federation rented temporary space in a warehouse located in the centre of Quebec, in Saint-Louis-de-Blandford, southeast of the city of Trois-Rivières. The security arrangements at the place were minimal, without cameras or alarm systems.

== Theft ==
Over the course of several months between 2011 and 2012, the contents of 9,571 barrels, valued at $18.7M, were stolen in a suspected insider job from a FPAQ facility in Saint-Louis-de-Blandford, Quebec. The syrup was stored in unmarked white metal barrels inspected only once a year. Thieves used trucks to transport barrels to a remote sugar shack, where they siphoned off the maple syrup, refilled the barrels with water, then returned them to the facility. As the operation progressed, the thieves started siphoning syrup directly off barrels in the reserve without refilling them. The stolen syrup was trucked to the south (Vermont) and east (New Brunswick), where it was trafficked in many small batches to reduce suspicion. It was typically sold to legitimate syrup distributors who were unaware of its origin.

== Discovery and investigation ==
In July 2012, the FPAQ took its annual inventory of syrup barrels. Inspector Michel Gauvreau started climbing up the barrels and nearly fell, expecting 600-pound (270 kg) barrels but finding them to be empty. Police later recovered hundreds of barrels of the syrup from an exporter based in Kedgwick, New Brunswick.

Between 18 and 20 December 2012, police arrested 17 men related to the theft.

== Perpetrators ==
- Richard Vallières (b. 1978), accused ringleader, sentenced in April 2017 to eight years in prison plus a $9.4 million fine, with an extension to fourteen years if the fine is not paid. In 2020, the Quebec Court of Appeal ruled that was excessive and lowered the fine to $1 million. The Supreme Court of Canada reversed that decision in 2022 and reinstated the original fine.
- Raymond Vallières (b. 1954), father of Richard, convicted of possession and was sentenced to two years in jail minus one day, followed by 3 years of probation.
- Étienne St-Pierre (b. 1943), a New Brunswick-based syrup reseller, was sentenced to two years in jail minus one day, 3 years of probation and an $850,000+ fine.
- Avik Caron (b. 1974), the insider whose spouse owned the FPAQ warehouse, sentenced to five years in prison plus a $1.2 million fine.
- Sébastien Jutras, a trucker involved in the transport of stolen syrup, served eight months in prison.

== See also ==
- The Sticky, a show inspired by the event
