= Maple syrup =

Syrup made from the sap of maple trees

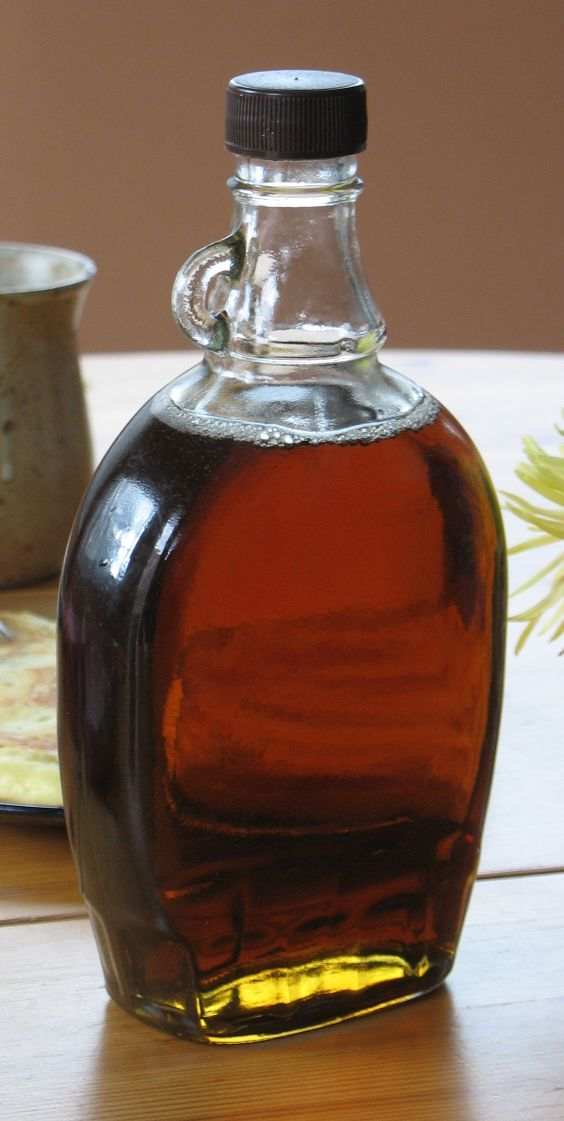
- Bottled maple syrup
- Place of origin: Canada; United States
- Main ingredients: Xylem sap (usually from sugar maple, red maple, or black maple)

Maple syrup is a sweet syrup made from the sap of maple trees. In cold climates these trees store starch in their trunks and roots before winter; the starch is then converted to sugar that rises in the sap in late winter and early spring. Maple trees are tapped by drilling holes into their trunks and collecting the sap, which is heated to evaporate much of the water, leaving the concentrated syrup.

Maple syrup was first made by the Indigenous people of Northeastern North America. The practice was adopted by European settlers, who gradually changed production methods. Technological improvements in the 1970s further refined syrup processing. Almost all of the world's maple syrup is produced in Canada and the United States, with Quebec alone accounting for 72% of global output.

Maple syrup is graded based on its colour and taste. Sucrose is the most prevalent sugar in maple syrup. In Canada syrups must be made exclusively from maple sap to qualify as maple syrup and must also be at least 66 per cent sugar. Maple syrup is often used as a condiment for pancakes, waffles, French toast, oatmeal or porridge. It is also used as an ingredient in baking and as a sweetener or flavouring agent.

== Sources ==
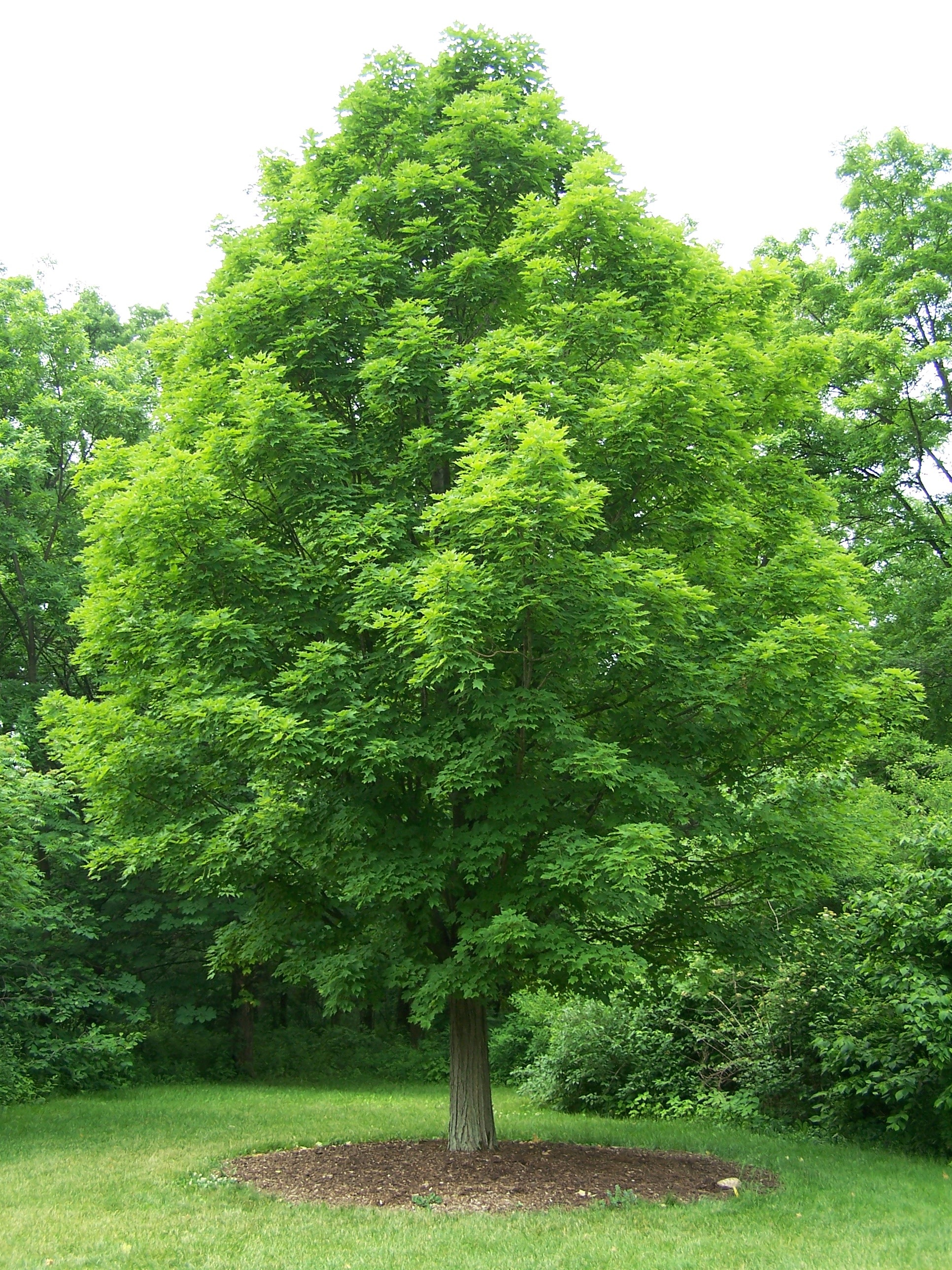
A sugar maple tree

Three species of maple (Acer) trees are the main sources of maple syrup: the sugar maple (A. saccharum), the black maple (A. nigrum), and the red maple (A. rubrum), because their sap has a high sugar content, two to five per cent. The black maple is included as a subspecies or variety in a more broadly viewed concept of A. saccharum, the sugar maple, by some botanists. Of these, the red maple has a shorter season because it buds earlier than sugar and black maples, which alters the flavour of the sap.

A few other species of maple are also sometimes used as sources of sap for producing maple syrup, including the box elder or Manitoba maple (Acer negundo), the silver maple (A. saccharinum), and the bigleaf maple (A. macrophyllum). In the Southeastern United States Florida sugar maple (Acer floridanum) is occasionally used for maple syrup production.

Similar syrups may also be produced from walnut, birch, or palm trees, among other sources.

== History ==
=== Indigenous peoples ===
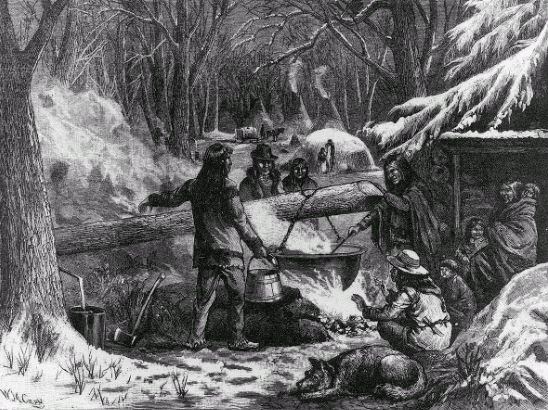
Sugar-Making Among the Indians in the North (19th-century illustration)

Indigenous peoples living in northeastern North America were the first groups known to have produced maple syrup and maple sugar. According to Indigenous oral traditions, as well as archaeological evidence, maple tree sap was being processed into syrup long before Europeans arrived in the region. There are no authenticated accounts of how maple syrup production and consumption began, but various legends exist; one of the most popular involves maple sap being used in place of water to cook venison served to a chief. Indigenous tribes developed rituals around syrup-making, celebrating the Sugar Moon (the first full moon of spring) with a Maple Dance. Many Indigenous dishes replaced the salt traditional in European cuisine with maple syrup.

The Algonquians recognized maple sap as a source of energy and nutrition. At the beginning of the spring thaw, they made V-shaped incisions in tree trunks; they then inserted reeds or concave pieces of bark to run the sap into clay buckets or tightly woven birch-bark baskets. The maple sap was concentrated first by leaving it exposed to the low temperatures overnight and disposing of the layer of ice that formed on top. Following that, the sap was transported by sled to large fires where it was boiled in clay pots to produce maple syrup. Often, multiple pots were used in conjunction, with the liquid being transferred between them as it grew more concentrated. Contrary to popular belief, syrup was not typically produced by dropping heated stones into wooden bowls, especially in northeast North America where Indigenous cultures had been using clay pots for thousands of years. However, modern and historic sources contain evidence that hot stones may have occasionally been used in the upper Midwest and Canada, where hollowed out logs and birchbark containers typically replaced clay pots.

=== Colonists ===
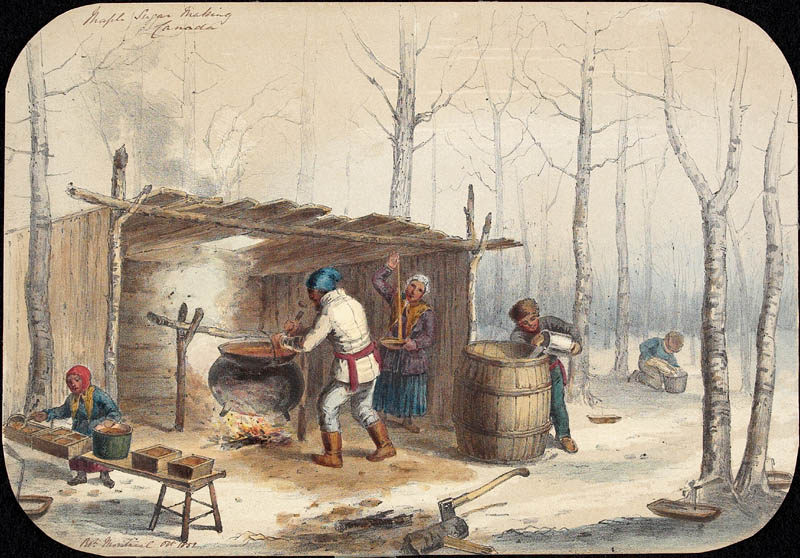
Sugar Making in Montreal, October 1852

In the early stages of European colonization in northeastern North America, local Indigenous peoples showed the arriving colonists how to tap the trunks of certain types of maples during the spring thaw to harvest the sap. André Thevet, the "Royal Cosmographer of France", wrote about Jacques Cartier drinking maple sap during his Canadian voyages. By 1680, European settlers and fur traders were involved in harvesting maple products. However, rather than making incisions in the bark, the Europeans used the method of drilling tapholes in the trunks with augers. Prior to the 19th century, processed maple sap was used primarily as a source of concentrated sugar, in both liquid and crystallized-solid form, as cane sugar had to be imported from the West Indies.

Maple sugaring parties typically began to operate at the start of the spring thaw in regions of woodland with sufficiently large numbers of maples. Syrup makers first bored holes in the trunks, usually more than one hole per large tree; they then inserted wooden spouts into the holes and hung a wooden bucket from the protruding end of each spout to collect the sap. The buckets were commonly made by cutting cylindrical segments from a large tree trunk and then hollowing out each segment's core from one end of the cylinder, creating a seamless, watertight container. Sap filled the buckets, and was then either transferred to larger holding vessels (barrels, large pots, or hollowed-out wooden logs), often mounted on sledges or wagons pulled by draft animals, or carried in buckets or other convenient containers. The sap-collection buckets were returned to the spouts mounted on the trees, and the process was repeated for as long as the flow of sap remained "sweet". The specific weather conditions of the thaw period were, and still are, critical in determining the length of the sugaring season. As the weather continues to warm, a maple tree's normal early spring biological process eventually alters the taste of the sap, making it unpalatable, perhaps due to an increase in amino acids.

The boiling process was very time-consuming. The harvested sap was transported back to the party's base camp, where it was then poured into large vessels (usually made from metal) and boiled down to achieve the desired concentration. The sap was usually transported using large barrels pulled by horses or oxen to a central collection point, where it was processed either over a fire built out in the open or inside a shelter built for that purpose (the "sugar shack").

=== Since 1850 ===
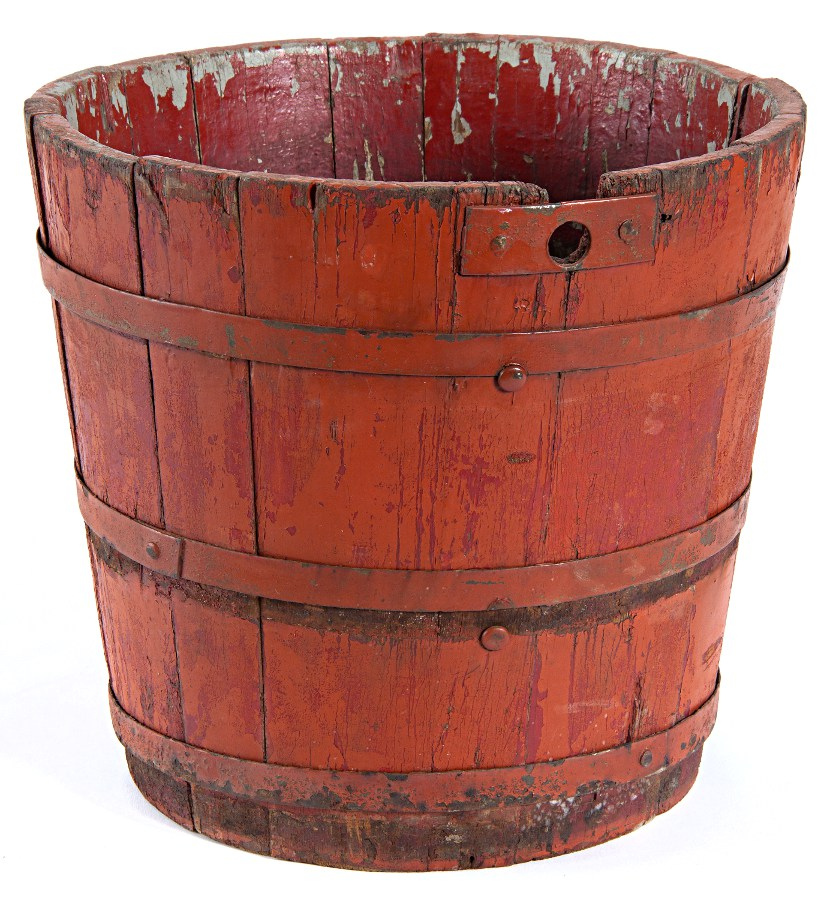
A bucket used to collect sap, built c. 1820

Around the time of the American Civil War (1861–1865), syrup makers started using large, flat sheet metal pans as they were more efficient for boiling than heavy, rounded iron kettles, because of a greater surface area for evaporation. Around this time, cane sugar replaced maple sugar as the dominant sweetener in the US; as a result, producers focused marketing efforts on maple syrup. The first evaporator, used to heat and concentrate sap, was patented in 1858. In 1872 an evaporator was developed that featured two pans and a metal arch or firebox, which greatly decreased boiling time. Around 1900, producers bent the tin that formed the bottom of a pan into a series of flues, which increased the heated surface area of the pan and again decreased boiling time. Some producers also added a finishing pan, a separate batch evaporator, as a final stage in the evaporation process.

Buckets began to be replaced with plastic bags, which allowed people to see at a distance how much sap had been collected. Syrup producers also began using tractors to haul vats of sap from the trees being tapped (the sugar bush) to the evaporator. Some producers adopted motor-powered tappers and metal tubing systems to convey sap from the tree to a central collection container, but these techniques were not widely used. Heating methods also diversified: modern producers use wood, oil, natural gas, propane, or steam to evaporate sap. Modern filtration methods were perfected to prevent contamination of the syrup.

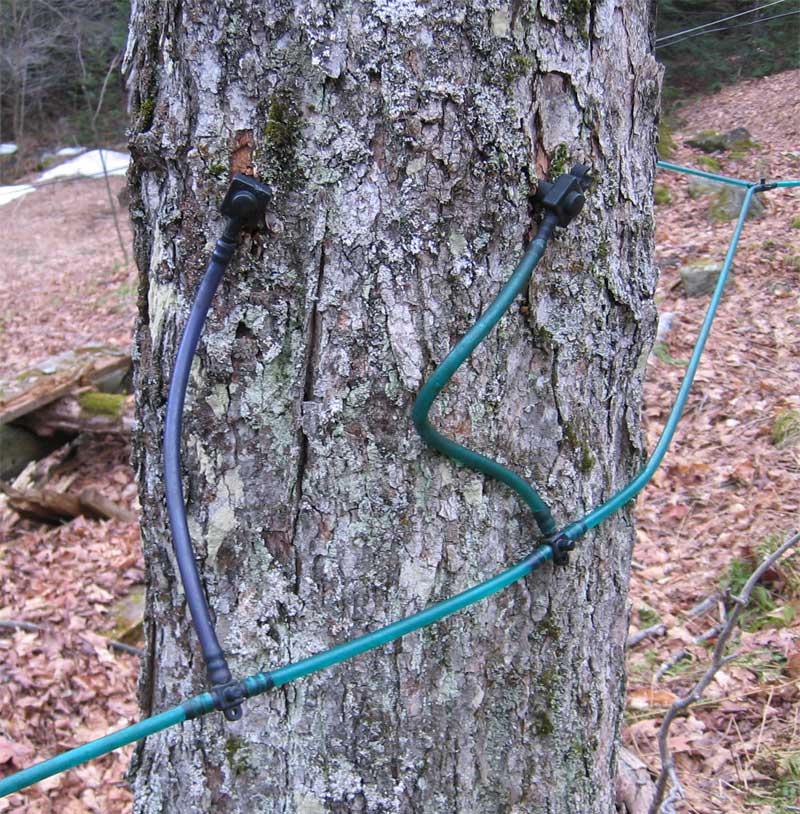
Two taps in a maple tree, using plastic tubing for sap collection

A large number of technological changes took place during the 1970s. Plastic tubing systems that had been experimental since the early part of the century were perfected, allowing sap to flow directly from the tree to the evaporator house. Vacuum pumps were added to the tubing systems, and preheaters were developed to recycle heat lost in the steam. Producers developed reverse-osmosis machines to take a portion of water out of the sap before it was boiled, increasing processing efficiency.

Advancements have since been made in tubing and vacuum pumps, filtering techniques, high-efficiency preheaters, and storage containers. Ongoing research focuses on pest control and enhanced woodlot management. In 2009 researchers at the University of Vermont unveiled a new type of tap that prevents sap backflow into the tree, thereby reducing bacterial contamination and discouraging the tree from sealing the borehole. Experiments suggest that saplings could be used in plantations in place of mature trees, potentially boosting productivity per acre dramatically. Because saplings have smaller diameters, they require less extreme diurnal temperature changes to trigger freeze–thaw cycles. This enables sap production in warmer climates beyond northeastern North America.

== Production ==
Regions of maple syrup production in Southeastern Canada and the Northeastern United States, according to the Maple Syrup Producers' Association of Ontario

Maple syrup production is centred in northeastern North America; however, given the correct weather conditions, it can be made wherever suitable species of maple trees grow, such as New Zealand, where there are efforts to establish commercial production.

Maple syrup production begins with collecting sap in a "sugarbush". Maples are usually tapped beginning at 30 to 40 years of age. Each tree can support between one and three taps, depending on its trunk diameter. The average maple tree will produce 35 to 50 litres (9.2 to 13.2 US gal) of sap per season, up to 12 litres (3.2 US gal) per day. This is roughly equal to seven per cent of its total sap. Tap seasons typically happen during late winter and spring and usually last for four to eight weeks, though the exact dates depend on the weather, location, and climate.

During the day, sucrose stored in the roots for the winter rises through the trunk as sugary sap. A hole is bored into the trunk of the tree to allow the sap to flow out of a spile that is tapped in the hole. The taps are left in place for the season, and the sap flows during the day when the temperature is above freezing. Some producers also tap in autumn, though this practice is less common than spring tapping. Maples can continue to be tapped for sap until they are over 100 years old.

Climate change is dramatically impacting the production of maple syrup. Increased temperatures in late winter/early spring causes the season for maple sap collection to shift earlier in the year, with increased summer temperatures causing a decrease in sugar content in sap, and drought/heavy rainfall impacting forest ecosystems.

== Processing ==
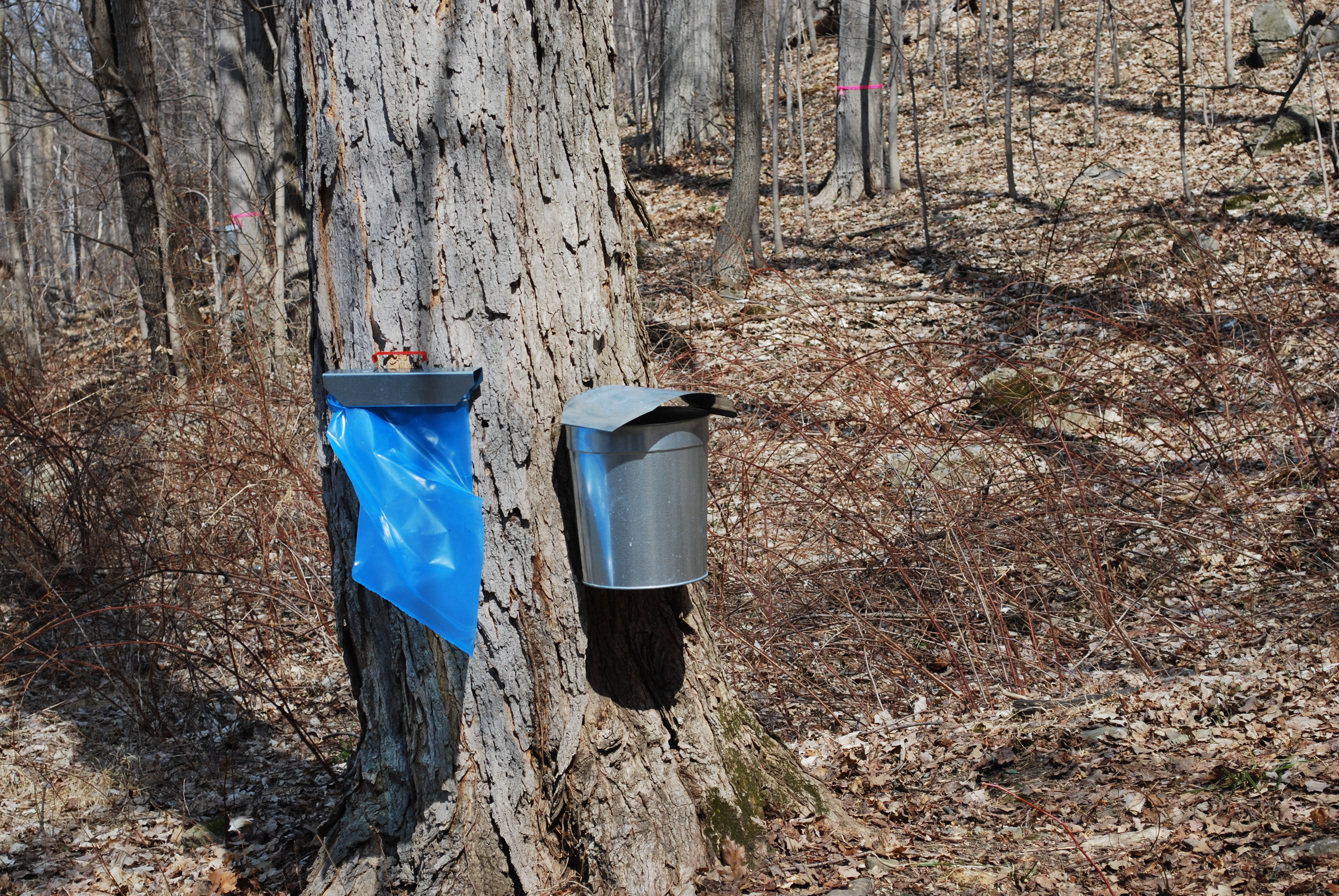
Traditional bucket tap and a plastic-bag tap

Sap is often processed in a "sugar shack", also known as a "sugarhouse", "sugar cabin", "sugar shanty", or cabane à sucre. Open pan evaporation methods have been streamlined since colonial days, but remain largely unchanged. Maple syrup is made by boiling between 20 and 50 volumes of sap (depending on its concentration) over an open fire until 1 volume of syrup is obtained, usually at a temperature 4.1 °C (7.4 °F) over the boiling point of water. As the boiling point of water varies with changes in air pressure, the correct value for pure water is determined at the place where the syrup is being produced each time evaporation is begun and periodically throughout the day. Syrup can be boiled entirely over one heat source or can be drawn off into smaller batches and boiled at a more controlled temperature. Defoamers are often added during boiling.

Boiling the syrup is a tightly controlled process, which ensures appropriate sugar content. Syrup boiled too long will eventually crystallize, whereas under-boiled syrup will be watery, and will quickly spoil. The finished syrup has a density of 66° on the Brix scale (a hydrometric scale used to measure sugar solutions). The syrup is then filtered to remove precipitated "sugar sand", crystals made up largely of sugar and calcium malate. These crystals are not toxic, but create a "gritty" texture in the syrup if not filtered out.

Maple sap harvesting

In addition to open pan evaporation methods, many large producers use the more fuel efficient reverse osmosis procedure to separate the water from the sap. Smaller producers can also use batchwise recirculating reverse osmosis, with the most energy-efficient operation taking the sugar concentration to 25% prior to boiling.

The higher the sugar content of the sap, the smaller the volume of sap is needed to obtain the same amount of syrup. To yield 1 unit of syrup, sap at 1.5 per cent sugar content will require 57 units, while sap at 3.5 per cent sugar content only needs 25 units of sap. The sap's sugar content is highly variable and will fluctuate even within the same tree.

The filtered syrup is graded and packaged while still hot, usually at a temperature of 82 °C (180 °F) or greater. The containers are turned over after being sealed to sterilize the cap with the hot syrup. Packages can be made of metal, glass, or coated plastic, depending on volume and target market. The syrup can also be heated longer and further processed to create a variety of other maple products, including maple sugar, maple butter or cream, and maple candy or taffy.

=== Off-flavours ===
Off-flavours can occasionally develop during the production of maple syrup, caused by contaminants in the boiling apparatus (such as disinfectants), microorganisms, fermentation byproducts, metallic can leaching, or "buddy sap"—an off-flavour that occurs late in the syrup season when tree budding has begun. In some circumstances it is possible to remove off-flavours through processing.

== Commerce ==
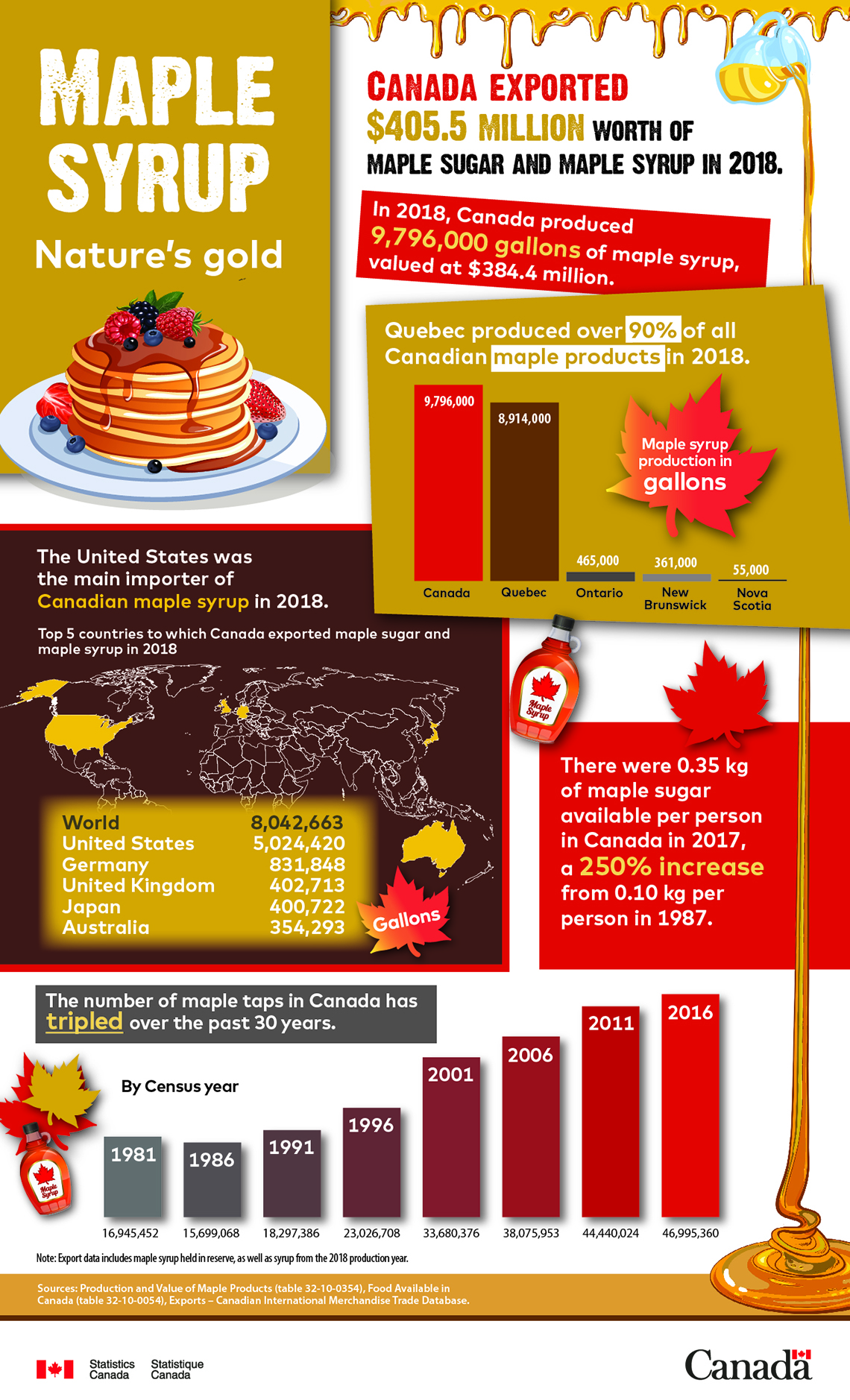
Canadian maple syrup production and exports, 2018

Until the 1930s, the United States produced most of the world's maple syrup. Today, after rapid growth in the 1990s, Canada produces more than 75 per cent of the world's maple syrup, producing more than 113.4 million kilograms (18.9 million gallons) in 2025. Within Canada, Quebec is the largest producer; Canadian exports of maple syrup in 2025 were C$844 million, with Quebec accounting for some 98 per cent of this total. In 2025 Canada exported $542.4 million of maple syrup to the United States, $60.4 million to Germany, $40.2 million to the UK, and 38.2 million to Australia, among other countries.

As of 2025, Quebec accounts for 90 per cent of maple syrup produced in Canada, followed by New Brunswick at 6.1 per cent and Ontario at 3.7 per cent. Ontario holds the most maple syrup farms in Canada outside of Quebec, with 389 maple syrup producers in 2021. This is followed by New Brunswick, with 114 producers; and Nova Scotia, with 39 producers. As of 2016, Quebec had some 7,300 producers working with 13,500 farmers, collectively making over 30 million litres (8 million US gallons) of syrup. Production in Quebec is controlled through a supply management system, with producers receiving quota allotments from the government sanctioned Quebec Maple Syrup Producers (QMSP; Les Producteurs et productrices acéricoles du Québec), which also maintains reserves of syrup, although there is a black-market trade in Quebec product. In 2017 the QMSP mandated increased output of maple syrup production, attempting to establish Quebec's dominance in the world market.

The Canadian provinces of Manitoba and Saskatchewan produce maple syrup using the sap of the box elder or Manitoba maple (Acer negundo). In 2011 there were 67 maple syrup producers in Manitoba and 24 in Saskatchewan. A Manitoba maple tree's yield is usually less than half that of a similar sugar maple tree. Manitoba maple syrup has a slightly different flavour from sugar-maple syrup, because it contains less sugar and the tree's sap flows more slowly. British Columbia is home to a growing maple sugar industry using sap from the bigleaf maple, which is native to the West Coast of the United States and Canada. In 2011 there were 82 maple syrup producers in British Columbia.

Around 25% of the world's total originated in the US in 2025. Vermont has long been the largest US producer, with a record 9.5 million litres (2.5 million US gallons) produced in 2022. In 2019 it led with over 7.8 million litres (2.07 million US gallons), followed by New York with 3.1 million L (820,000 US gal) and Maine with 2.2 million L (580,000 US gal). Wisconsin, Ohio, New Hampshire, Michigan, Pennsylvania, Massachusetts and Connecticut all produced marketable quantities of maple syrup.

Maple syrup has been produced on a small scale in some other countries, notably Japan and South Korea. However, in South Korea in particular, it is traditional to consume maple sap, called gorosoe, instead of processing it into syrup.

== Markings ==
Under Canadian maple product regulations, containers of maple syrup must include the words "maple syrup", its grade name and net quantity in litres or millilitres, on the main display panel with a minimum font size of 1.6 mm. If the maple syrup is of Canada Grade A level, the name of the colour class must appear on the label in both English and French. Also, the lot number or production code, and either: (1) the name and address of the sugar bush establishment, packing or shipper establishment, or (2) the first dealer and the registration number of the packing establishment, must be labelled on any display panel other than the bottom.

== Grades ==
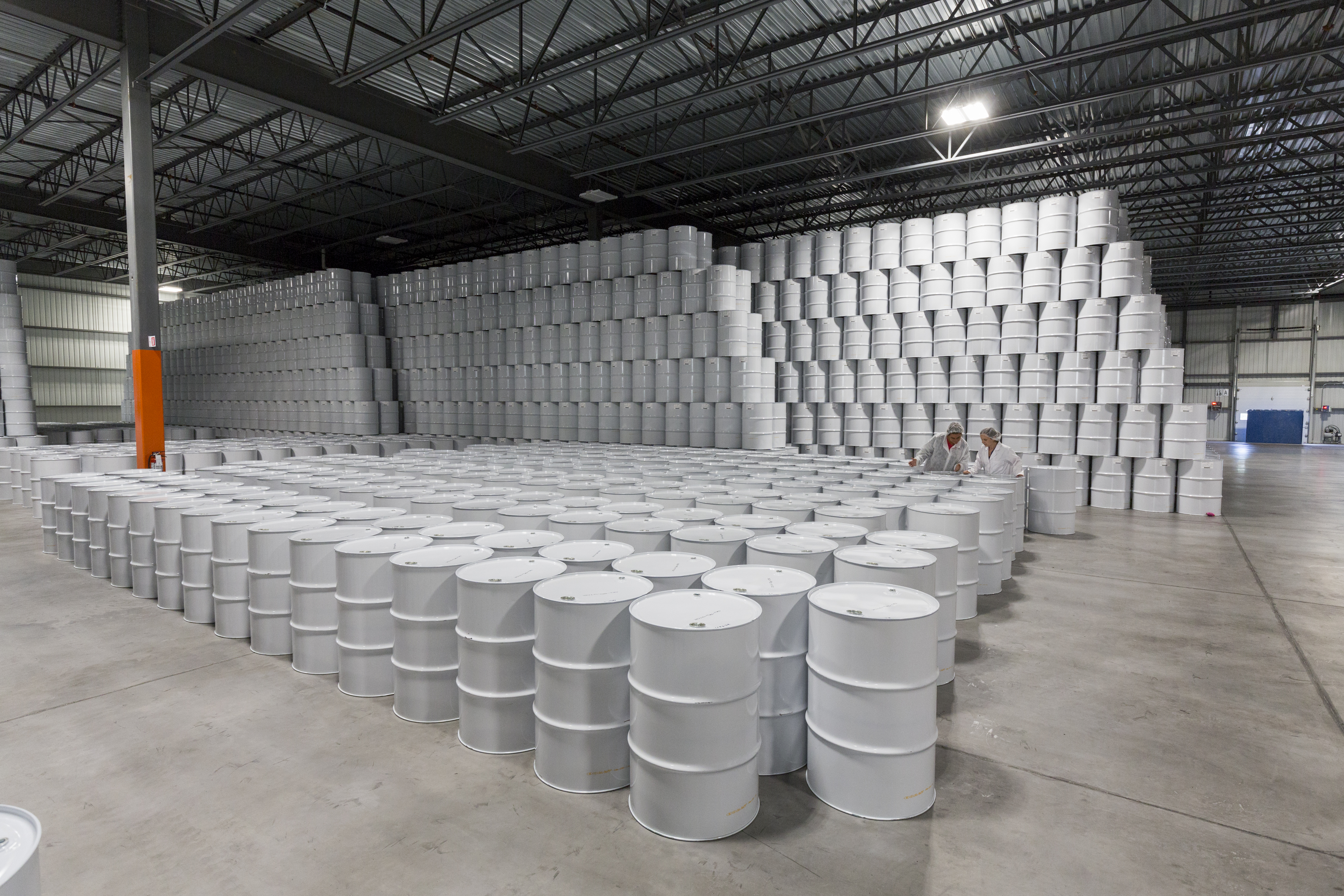
Barrels of the Quebec maple syrup reserve in Laurierville in 2016

Following an effort from the International Maple Syrup Institute (IMSI) and many maple syrup producer associations, both Canada and the United States have altered their laws regarding the classification of maple syrup to be uniform. Whereas in the past each state or province had their own laws on the classification of maple syrup, now those laws define a unified grading system. This had been a work in progress for several years, and most of the finalization of the new grading system was made in 2014. The Canadian Food Inspection Agency (CFIA) announced in the Canada Gazette on 28 June 2014 that rules for the sale of maple syrup would be amended to include new descriptors, at the request of the IMSI.

As of 31 December 2014, the CFIA and as of 2 March 2015, the United States Department of Agriculture (USDA) Agricultural Marketing Service issued revised standards intended to harmonize Canadian and United States regulations on the classification of maple syrup as follows:

- Grade A
  - Golden colour and delicate taste
  - Amber colour and rich taste
  - Dark colour and robust taste
  - Very dark colour and strong taste
- Processing grade
- Substandard

As long as maple syrup does not have an off-flavour, is of a uniform colour, and is free from turbidity and sediment, it can be labelled as one of the A grades. If it exhibits any problems, it does not meet Grade A requirements. It then must be labelled as "processing grade" maple syrup and may not be sold in containers smaller than 20 litres (5 US gal). If maple syrup does not meet the requirements of processing-grade maple syrup (including a fairly characteristic maple taste), it is classified as substandard.

This grading system was accepted and made law by most maple-producing states and provinces, and became compulsory in Canada as of 13 December 2016. Vermont, in an effort to "jump-start" the new grading regulations, adopted the new grading system as of 1 January 2014, after the grade changes passed the US Senate and House in 2013. Maine passed a bill to take effect as soon as both Canada and the United States adopted the new grades. In New York the new grade changes became law on 1 January 2015. New Hampshire did not require legislative approval and so the new grade laws became effective as of 16 December 2014, and producer compliance was required as of 1 January 2016.

Golden and amber grades typically have a milder flavour than dark and very dark, which are both dark and have an intense maple flavour. The darker grades of syrup are used primarily for cooking and baking, although some specialty dark syrups are produced for table use. Syrup harvested earlier in the season tends to yield a lighter colour. With the new grading system, the classification of maple syrup depends ultimately on its internal transmittance at 560 nm wavelength through a 10 mm sample. Golden must have 75 per cent or more transmittance, amber must have 50.0 to 74.9 per cent transmittance, dark must have 25.0 to 49.9 per cent transmittance, and very dark is any product having less than 25.0 per cent transmittance.

=== Old grading system ===
In Canada maple syrup was classified prior to 31 December 2014 by the Canadian Food Inspection Agency (CFIA) as one of three grades, each with several colour classes:

- Canada No. 1, including
  - Extra light
  - Light
  - Medium
- No. 2 amber
- No. 3 dark or any other ungraded category

Producers in Ontario or Quebec may have followed either federal or provincial grading guidelines. Quebec's and Ontario's guidelines differed slightly from the federal:

- there were two "number" categories in Quebec
  - Number 1, with four colour classes
  - Number 2, with five colour classes
- As in Quebec, Ontario's producers had two "number" grades:
  - Number 1, with three colour classes
  - Number 2, with one colour class, which was typically referred to as "Ontario Amber" when produced and sold in that province only

A typical year's yield for a maple syrup producer will be about 25 to 30 per cent of each of the #1 colours, 10 per cent #2 amber, and 2 per cent #3 dark.

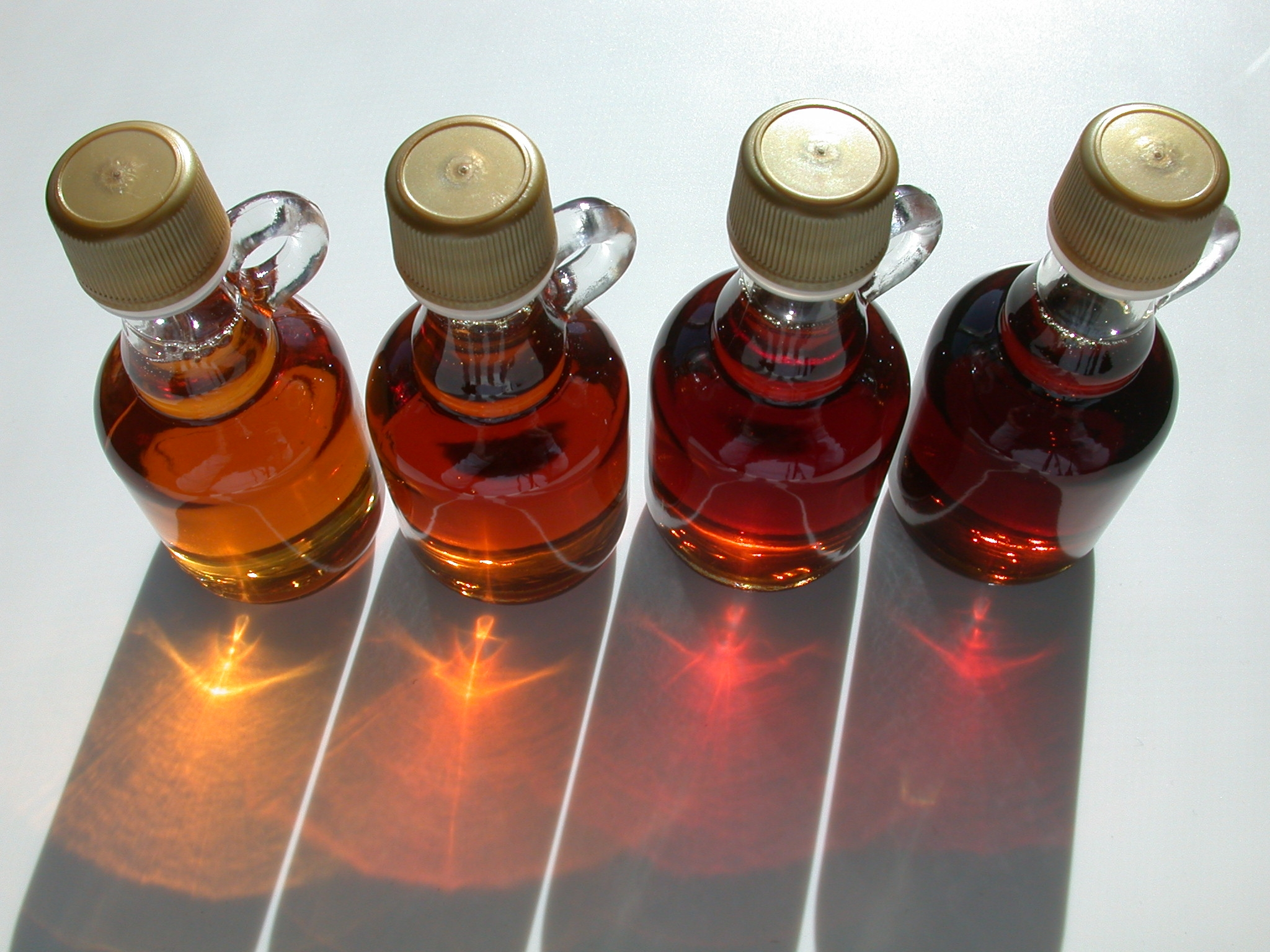
Old US maple syrup grades, left to right: Grade A Light Amber ("Fancy") Grade A Medium Amber Grade A Dark Amber Grade B

The United States used different grading standards – some states still do as they await state regulation. Maple syrup was divided into two major grades:

- Grade A
  - Light amber (sometimes known as fancy)
  - Medium amber
  - Dark amber
- Grade B

In Massachusetts the Grade B was renamed "Grade A Very Dark, Strong Taste"

The Vermont Agency of Agriculture Food and Markets used a similar grading system of colour, and is roughly equivalent, especially for lighter syrups, but using letters: "AA", "A", etc. The Vermont grading system differed from the US system in maintaining a slightly higher standard of product density (measured on the Baumé scale). New Hampshire maintained a similar standard, but not a separate state grading scale. The Vermont-graded product had 0.9 per cent more sugar and less water in its composition than US-graded. One grade of syrup not for table use, called commercial or Grade C, was also produced under the Vermont system.

== Packing regulations ==
In Canada the packing of maple syrup must follow the "Packing" conditions stated in the maple products regulations, or utilize the equivalent Canadian or imported grading system.

As stated in the maple products regulations, Canadian maple syrup can be classified as "Canadian Grade A" and "Canadian Processing Grade". Any maple syrup container under these classifications should be filled to at least 90% of the bottle size while still containing the net quantity of syrup product as stated on the label. Every container of maple syrup must be new if it has a capacity of 5 litres or less or is marked with a grade name. Every container of maple sugar must also be new if it has a capacity of less than 5 kg or is either exported out of Canada or conveyed from one province to another.

Each maple syrup product must be verified clean if it follows a grade name or if it is exported out of the province in which it was originally manufactured.

== Nutrition ==
Maple syrup
Nutritional value per 100 g (3.5 oz)
- Energy: 1,088 kJ (260 kcal)
- Carbohydrates: 67 g
- Sugars: 60.4
- Fat: 0.06 g
- Protein: 0.04 g
Vitamins and minerals
Vitamins	Quantity %DV^{†}
Thiamine (B1)	6% 0.066 mg
Riboflavin (B2)	98% 1.27 mg
Niacin (B3)	1% 0.081 mg
Pantothenic acid (B5)	1% 0.036 mg
Vitamin B6	0% 0.002 mg
Folate (B9)	0% 0 μg
Choline	0% 1.6 mg
Vitamin C	0% 0 mg
Minerals	Quantity %DV^{†}
Calcium	8% 102 mg
Iron	1% 0.11 mg
Magnesium	5% 21 mg
Manganese	126% 2.908 mg
Phosphorus	0% 2 mg
Potassium	7% 212 mg
Sodium	1% 12 mg
Zinc	13% 1.47 mg
- Other constituents: Quantity
- Water: 32.4 g
- Link to USDA Database entry
- ^{†}Percentages estimated using US recommendations for adults, except for potassium, which is estimated based on expert recommendation from the National Academies.

The basic ingredient in maple syrup is the sap from the xylem of sugar maple or various other species of maple trees. It consists primarily of sucrose and water, with small amounts of the monosaccharides glucose and fructose from the inverted sugar created in the boiling process.

In a 100g amount maple syrup provides 260 calories and is composed of 32 per cent water by weight, 67 per cent carbohydrates (90 per cent of which are sugars), and no appreciable protein or fat (table). Maple syrup is generally low in overall micronutrient content, although manganese and riboflavin are at high levels along with moderate amounts of zinc and calcium (right table). It also contains trace amounts of amino acids which increase in content as sap flow occurs.

Maple syrup contains a wide variety of polyphenols and volatile organic compounds, including vanillin, hydroxybutanone, lignans, propionaldehyde, and numerous organic acids. It is not yet known exactly all compounds responsible for the distinctive flavour of maple syrup, although primary flavour-contributing compounds are maple furanone (5-ethyl-3-hydroxy-4-methyl-2(5H)-furanone), strawberry furanone, and maltol. A more recently identified compound is quebecol, created when the maple sap is boiled to create syrup. Its sweetness derives from a high content of sucrose (99% of total sugars). Its brown colour – a significant factor in the appeal and the quality grading of maple syrup – develops during thermal evaporation.

One author described maple syrup as "a unique ingredient, smooth- and silky-textured, with a sweet, distinctive flavour – hints of caramel with overtones of toffee will not do – and a rare colour, amber set alight. Maple flavour is, well, maple flavour, uniquely different from any other." Agriculture Canada has developed a "flavour wheel" that details 91 unique flavours that can be present in maple syrup. These flavours are divided into 13 families: vanilla, burnt, milky, fruity, floral, spicy, foreign (deterioration or fermentation), foreign (environment), maple, confectionery, plant (herbaceous), plant (forest, humus or cereals), and plant (ligneous). These flavours are evaluated using a procedure similar to wine tasting. Other culinary experts praise its unique flavour. Environmental factors, including weather and soil type, impact flavour.

Maple syrup and its various artificial imitations are widely used as toppings for pancakes, waffles, and French toast in North America. They also serve as flavouring for foods such as fritters, ice cream, porridge, fresh fruit, bacon, and sausages. It is also used as sweetener for granola, applesauce, baked beans, candied sweet potatoes, winter squash, cakes, pies, breads, tea, coffee, and hot toddies.

== Imitations ==
In Canada maple syrup must be made entirely from maple sap, and syrup must have a density of 66° on the Brix scale to be marketed as maple syrup. In the United States maple syrup must be made almost entirely from maple sap, although small amounts of substances such as salt may be added. Labelling laws prohibit imitation syrups from having "maple" in their names unless the finished product contains 10 per cent or more of natural maple syrup.

Table syrup, also known as pancake syrup and waffle syrup, is often used as a substitute for maple syrup. Table syrups are mostly made using corn syrup and high-fructose corn syrup, giving them a less complex and more artificial flavour compared to maple syrup. In the United States consumers generally prefer imitation syrups, likely because of the significantly lower cost and sweeter flavour; they typically cost about $2 per litre ($8 per US gallon), whereas authentic maple syrup costs $11–$16 per litre ($40–$60 per US gallon) as of 2015.

In 2016 maple syrup producers from nine US states petitioned the Food and Drug Administration (FDA) to regulate labelling of products containing maple syrup or using the word "maple" in manufactured products, indicating that imitation maple products contained insignificant amounts of natural maple syrup. In September 2016 the FDA published a consumer advisory to carefully inspect the ingredient list of products labelled as "maple".

== Cultural significance ==
The motif on the flag of Canada is a maple leaf.

Maple products are considered emblematic of Canada, and are frequently sold in tourist shops and airports as souvenirs from Canada. The sugar maple's leaf has come to symbolize Canada, and is depicted on the country's flag. Several US states, including West Virginia, New York, Vermont, and Wisconsin, have the sugar maple as their state tree. A scene of sap collection is depicted on the Vermont state quarter, issued in 2001.

Maple syrup and maple sugar were used during the American Civil War and by abolitionists in the years before the war because most cane sugar and molasses were produced by enslaved people in the South. Because of food rationing during the Second World War, people in the northeastern United States were encouraged to stretch their sugar rations by sweetening foods with maple syrup and maple sugar, and recipe books were printed to help housewives employ this alternative source.

== See also ==
- Great Canadian Maple Syrup Heist
- List of foods made from maple
- List of syrups
- Mapleine
- Treacle
