= I, Curmudgeon =

- Directed by: Alan Zweig
- Produced by: Michael McMahon
- Edited by: Christopher Donaldson
- Release date: 2004
- Country: Canada
- Language: English

I, Curmudgeon is a 2004 documentary film by Alan Zweig about curmudgeons, himself included.

Self-declared curmudgeons interviewed in the film also include Harvey Pekar, Fran Lebowitz, Mark Eitzel, Cintra Wilson, Bruce La Bruce, Andy Rooney and Scott Thompson.

The film was shot with a camcorder, with Zweig using a mirror to record his own experiences.

== Film festivals ==
The film was selected to the 2004 Hot Docs Canadian International Documentary Festival and received a Silver Hugo at the 2005 Chicago International Film Festival. It also received an honorary mention at the Brooklyn Underground Film Festival, in 2005.
