= There Is a House Here =

- Directed by: Alan Zweig
- Produced by: Kristina McLaughlin; Kevin McMahon; Michael McMahon
- Starring: Lucie Idlout
- Cinematography: John Price
- Edited by: Robert Swartz
- Music by: Michael Zweig
- Production companies: Primitive Entertainment; TVOntario
- Release date: September 12, 2017 (TIFF)
- Running time: 105 minutes
- Country: Canada
- Language: English

There Is a House Here is a Canadian documentary film by Alan Zweig, which premiered at the 2017 Toronto International Film Festival. Taking its name from the English translation of Igloolik, the film explores several visits by Zweig to the Canadian territory of Nunavut, accompanied by rock singer Lucie Idlout.
