= Quebec Maple Syrup Producers =

Canadian agricultural cartel

Quebec Maple Syrup Producers Producteurs et productrices acéricoles du Québec
- Abbreviation: QMSP
- Formation: 1966 (60 years ago)
- Type: Cartel
- Region served: Quebec
- Members: 13,500 maple syrup producers
- Official language: French, English
- President: Luc Goulet
- Website: ppaq.ca/en/
- Formerly called: Federation of Quebec Maple Syrup Producers

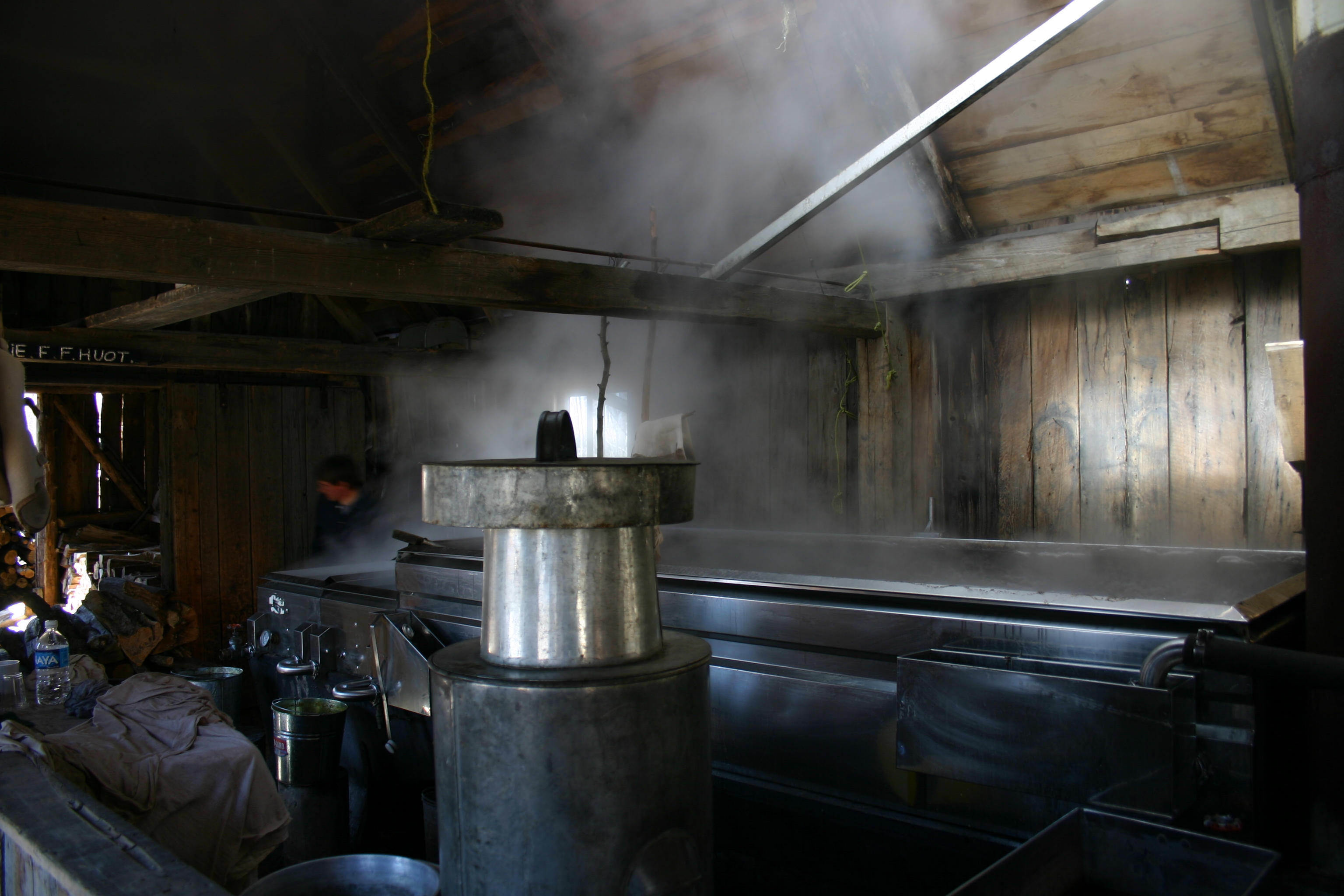
Syrup production in a Quebec sugar house (2005)

Quebec Maple Syrup Producers (QMSP; French: Producteurs et productrices acéricoles du Québec, PPAQ) is a federated organization that regulates the production and marketing of maple syrup from Quebec. It was known as the Federation of Quebec Maple Syrup Producers (French: Fédération des producteurs acéricoles du Québec, FPAQ) until 2018. As of 2011, the FPAQ produced 94% of Canadian maple syrup and 77% of the world's supply.

The QMSP plays a role in the collective marketing of maple products and in organizing sales inside and outside the province.

== History ==
Beginning in 1958, the maple syrup producers of Beauce region in the south of Quebec participated in a joint plan to protect their rights as producers and to collectively market maple syrup. This effort inspired the formation of a larger agreement all across Quebec in 1966.

Since 1989, all QMSP’s producers abide by a collective agreement to market their product. Together, the producers establish policies, negotiate their selling strategy, enforce production quota, set up quality criteria and sponsor promotional activities. The QMSP collaborates with the ACER centre to conduct research and experiments on maple syrup.

In 2000, the Federation became the exclusive sales agent for bulk sales and in 2004, they reformed the quota system. In 2017, the federation had to add five million taps due to the rise of foreign competition.

== Promotion and marketing ==
Logo until 2018

The QMSP is involved in many promotional activities that aim to spread the maple syrup market around the world. The QMSP hosts culinary competitions within Quebec but also in Japan and the United States. The QMSP has held showcases in Hiroshima and free maple syrup tastings as promotional activities. Chefs and professionals from Hiroshima participated in a culinary competition that included an original recipe using maple syrup in 2010. The QMSP aims to spread consumer awareness of their product in Japan in order to increase their consumption and Quebec’s exportation. The QMSP has engaged into an agreement with Tokyo DisneySea, a Disney theme park, to promote maple syrup and encourage people in Japan to purchase and consume it. Market strategies in Quebec are common as well; however they aim to further educate and to keep the maple syrup legacy alive in the future generations. Culinary competitions involving traditional family recipes aspire to do so. Teachers are encouraged to educate their students on maple trees and the production of maple syrup with the help of a newly published maple syrup encyclopedia.

== Strategic reserve ==
The QMSP maintains a strategic reserve of maple syrup, officially known as the International Strategic Reserve (ISR) and also referred to as the Global Strategic Maple Syrup Reserve. The reserve is used to support global maple syrup prices and supply, and has been called "the OPEC of the maple syrup world" by The Economist. A barrel is worth about $1,200 or $2.88 per pound which is 10-18 times the value of U.S. crude oil.

The reserve is located in warehouses in a number of rural Quebec towns. The first two facilities were in Saint-Antoine-de-Tilly (which holds 6,300 tonnes or 6,900 short tons), and Plessisville (which holds 1,400 tonnes or 1,500 short tons).

=== History ===
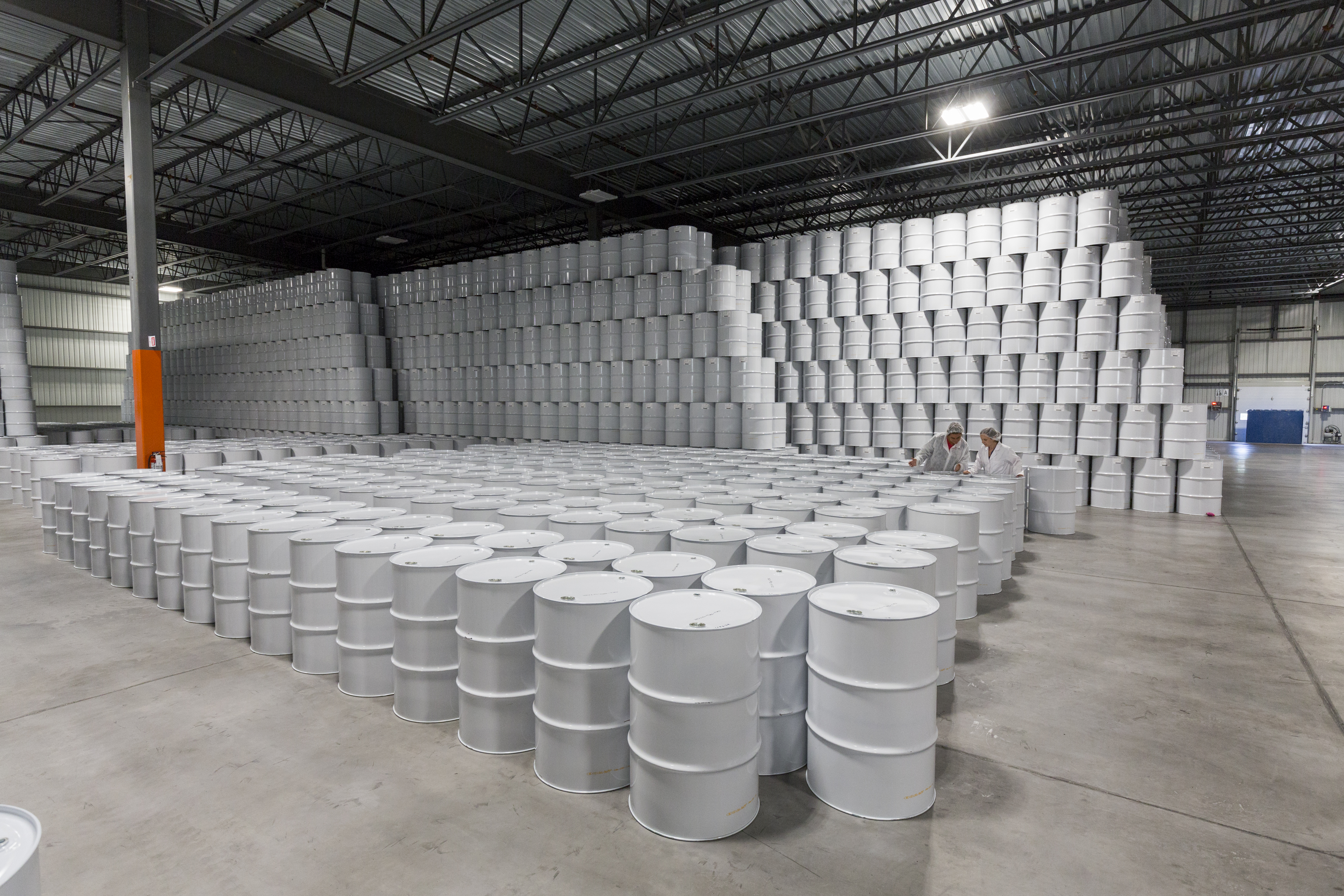
Strategic maple syrup reserve barrels in Laurierville

The strategic reserve was created in 2000.

In 2008, following multiple years of poor production, the reserves were depleted, causing a price hike and the loss of markets for pure maple syrup.

In 2011, a year which saw huge excesses of maple syrup production, FPAQ expanded the ISR to a third warehouse in Saint-Louis-de-Blandford, which holds 4,500 tonnes (5,000 short tons) of syrup.

In August 2012, thieves were reported to have stolen roughly 1,000 tonnes (1,100 short tons) of syrup worth CA$30 million from the new ISR facility in Saint-Louis-de-Blandford. This event is known informally as the Great Canadian Maple Syrup Heist. The amount stolen was about a quarter of the facility's reserve. Slightly over a month later, police seized maple syrup stocks from a Kedgwick, New Brunswick, exporter on suspicion that it had been purchased from a Quebec supplier connected to the ISR theft. Over the next three months, police had further success in locating portions of the stolen syrup, but were still unsure of the final disposition of about one third of it. Much of it had apparently been sold to buyers who were unaware of its origins and who were led to believe it had been produced in neighbouring New Brunswick. On 18 December, police arrested three men known to have access to the warehouse from which the syrup was stolen. Fifteen more people were arrested on 20 December, with police still looking for another seven. The theft and its backstory are featured in the Netflix documentary series Dirty Money, Season 1, Episode 5.

On 28 April 2017, accused ringleader Richard Vallières, convicted in November 2016, was sentenced to eight years in prison and a $9.4 million fine. He can choose another six years of prison over paying the fine, and appealed the conviction. The missing syrup was valued at 3,000 tonnes (3,300 short tons) and $18.7 million. A few days earlier, his accomplice, Avik Caron, was sentenced to 5 years in prison and a $1.2-million fine. The Supreme Court of Canada rejected Vallières's appeal in March 2022.

On 25 January 2018, maple syrup producers Nathalie Bombardier and Daniel Gaudreau had their supply seized by the Sûreté du Québec, due to their refusal to sell their surplus production through the Federation. Instead Bombardier and Gaudreau prefer to sell their supply directly to businesses.

In 2021, the QMSP announced it would release 22.7 million kilograms (50 million pounds) of maple syrup from the reserves to meet global demand. The maple syrup industry experienced record years in 2019, 2020 and 2021. Experts believe an increase in home cooking due to the COVID-19 pandemic accelerated the increased demand for maple syrup production.
