= Cory Kahaney =

American comedienne, writer, and actress

- Education: Emerson College, Boston, Massachusetts
- Notable work: Performer Comedy Central Presents; Cory Kahaney: From Happy Hour to Last Call; Ha!ifax Comedy Fest; Host of Last Comic Standing
- Spouse: Kenneth Misrok (m. 2002)

Comedy career
- Years active: 1980–present
- Medium: Stand-up; television; film; radio; literature; one man show
- Genres: Observational comedy; black comedy; sketch comedy; satire; political satire; news satire
- Subjects: American politics; American culture; current events; race relations

Cory Kahaney is an American stand-up comedienne, actress, writer, and public speaker. She was a grand finalist on NBC's Last Comic Standing and a semi-finalist on America's Got Talent. Kahaney has performed comedy specials for Comedy Central and HBO.

As a public speaker, Kahaney delivered a TEDx talk titled "The Joke That Saved My Life," which recounts her journey from surviving domestic abuse to building a career in comedy. Her other notable talks include "Don’t Tell Jerry Lewis Women Are Funny," a multimedia presentation featuring rare archival footage that celebrates pioneering women in comedy and their contributions to the standup genre.

She has been featured several times at prominent events such as the Just for Laughs Festival in Montreal, Canada, the Johnny Carson Festival, the Halifax Comedy Festival, the New York Comedy Festival, and the Nantucket Comedy Festival.

Kahaney appeared on Season 5, Episode 4 of The Apprentice. She was hired by team Gold Rush to perform at an event for GM dealers celebrating the launch of the 2007 Chevy Tahoe. Her set was considered inappropriate by many attendees, contributing to Gold Rush's loss.

In addition to her standup work, Kahaney co-wrote the Zarna Garg comedy special One in a Billion on Prime Video. Her humorous writing has been published in The Guardian and the New York Observer.

== Personal life ==
In A Shared Universe Podcast, Kahaney shared that the best comedy often originates from tragic experiences. She highlighted how a pivotal moment in her life as a domestic violence survivor revealed her "secret power"—using humor to interrupt dangerous situations and ultimately save herself.

== Awards and honors ==
Kahaney has received several awards, including being named Best Comedian in New York City by Backstage Magazine and Best Female Comedian by the MAC Awards (Manhattan Association Of Cabarets).

== Filmography ==
| Year | Title | Role | Notes |
|---|---|---|---|
| 2016 | The Hudson Tribes | Miriam | |
| 2013 | When Jews Were Funny | Herself | |
| 2009 | Awaken The Night | Cop #2 | |

=== Television ===
| Year | Title | Role | Notes |
|---|---|---|---|
| 2024 | Cory Kahaney: From Happy Hour to Last Call | Performer and writer | |
| 2023 | One in a Billion | Writer | |
| 2010 | The Ha!ifax Comedy Fest | Performer and writer | Three episodes |
| 2004 | Comedy Central Presents | Performer and writer | One episode. |
