= Jon Winokur =

American writer and editor (born 1947)

Jon Winokur (born 1947) is an American writer and editor. Also known by the pseudonym, "Howard Ogden".

Born in Detroit, the son of Martin M. and Elinor Winokur, he attended Temple University (BA, 1970) and the University of West Los Angeles (JD, 1980).

== Books ==
- MasterTips (Potshot Press, 1985).
- Writers on Writing (Running Press, 1986)
- The Portable Curmudgeon (NAL, 1987)
- Zen to Go (NAL, 1988)
- A Curmudgeon’s Garden of Love (NAL, 1989)
- Friendly Advice (Dutton, 1990)
- Mondo Canine (Dutton, 1991)
- True Confessions (Dutton, 1992)
- The Portable Curmudgeon Redux (Dutton, 1992)
- Fathers (Dutton, 1993)
- Je Ne Sais What? (Dutton, 1995)
- Return Of The Portable Curmudgeon (Penguin, 1995)
- The Rich Are Different (Pantheon, 1996)
- Happy Motoring (with Norrie Epstein; Abbeville, 1997)
- Advice to Writers (Pantheon, 1999)
- How to Win at Golf Without Actually Playing Well (Pantheon, 2000)
- The Traveling Curmudgeon (Sasquatch, 2003)
- The War Between the State (Sasquatch, 2004)
- Encyclopedia Neurotica (St. Martin’s, 2005)
- In Passing (Sasquatch, 2005)
- Ennui to Go (Sasquatch, 2005)
- The Big Curmudgeon (Black Dog & Leventhal, 2007)
- The Big Book of Irony (St. Martin’s, 2007)
- The Garner Files: A Memoir (with James Garner; Simon & Schuster, 2011)
- But Enough About Me: A Memoir (with Burt Reynolds; Putnam, 2015)
